Martin Pickford was lecturer in the Chair of Paleoanthropology and Prehistory at the Collège de France and honorary affiliate at the Département Histoire de la Terre in the Muséum national d'Histoire.  In 2001, Martin Pickford together with Brigitte Senut and their team discovered Orrorin tugenensis, a hominid primate species dated between 5.8 and 6.2 million years ago and a potential ancestor of the genus Australopithecus.

Biographical details 
Pickford was born in 1943 in Wiltshire, England. He is the 4th child of Austin Joseph Pickford and Eleanor Margery Pickford née Holman. The family moved to Kenya in 1946. He read for his first degree between 1967 and 1971 in Dalhousie University and took a PhD at the University of London in 1975. Between 1978 and 2003 he worked at Kenya National Museums at the Muséum National d'Histoire Naturelle, Paris and as a Fellow at the University of Mainz, Germany and has since held various visiting professorships.

Research in Africa

At the time of Orrorin's discovery, researchers wishing to carry out palaeontological research in Kenya were required to be affiliated with an officially sanctioned Kenyan research organisation. Prior to 1993 the only institution with this privilege was the Kenya National Museums, in which Pickford was Head of the Department of Sites and Monuments from 1978 to 1984. As such the museum and its director used to enjoy a monopoly on palaeontological research in Kenya. However, 7 years before the discovery of Orrorin in 2000, following intense pressure from the international community, the Kenyan Government liberalised many facets of the political, economic and bureaucratic life of the country, and this included the monopoly on the country's palaeontological and archaeological resources that the National Museums of Kenya and its director Richard Leakey had previously enjoyed, both prior to, and following, the country's independence in 1963.

In 1984, Pickford was congratulated in writing by the then director of the National Museums of Kenya Richard Leakey, with whom Pickford had attended high school in Nairobi, for completing three two-year contracts at the museum. Leakey informed Pickford that it was not possible to renew the contract a fourth time, as at that time there was a government-set limit placed on the quantity of such renewals. Pickford then settled in France, and in 1985, after contacting the Uganda Government, he launched the Uganda Paleontology Expedition.

From 1971 to 1978 Pickford had carried out extensive research in the Tugen Hills under a permit issued by the Kenyan Office of the President. During the surveys Pickford and his team found many important fossils ranging in age from 15 million to 2 million years old. In 1974 he found the first hominid fossil from the 6-million-year-old Lukeino Formation (published in Nature in 1975), a lower molar, which is today included in the hypodigm of Orrorin tugenensis.

Selected publications 

Senut, B., Pickford, M., Gommery, D., Mein, P., Cheboi, K., & Coppens, Y. (20 January 2001). First hominid from the Miocene (Lukeino Formation, Kenya). Comptes Rendus Académie des Sciences Paris, Série IIA Sciences de la Terre et des Planètes, 332, 137–144.

Pickford, M. (30 January 2001). The geological and faunal context of Late Miocene hominid remains from Lukeino, KenyaContexte géologique et faunique des restes d'hominidés du Miocène supérieur de Lukeino, Kenya. Comptes Rendus Académie des Sciences Paris, Série IIA Sciences de la Terre et des Planètes, 332, 2, 145–152.

Pickford, M. (1997). Louis B. Leakey: Beyond the evidence. London: Janus Pub. Co.

Sources
http://www.nature.com/nature/journal/v410/n6828/full/410508a0.html

External links

References
0. Pickford, M., 1974. Stratigraphy and Palaeoecology of Five Late Cainozoic Formations in the Kenya Rift Valley. Unpublished PhD Thesis, University of London, 219 pp.
1. Pickford, M., 1975. Another African chalicothere. Nature, 253: 85.
2. Bishop, W.W., & Pickford, M., 1975. Geology, fauna and palaeoenvironments of the Ngorora Formation, Kenya Rift Valley, Nature, 254: 185–192.
3. Pickford, M., 1975. New fossil Orycteropodidae (Mammalia, Tubulidentata) from East Africa. Neth. Jl Zool. 25: 57–88.
4. Pickford, M., & Wilkinson, A., 1975. Stratigraphic and phylogenetic implications of new Listriodontinae from Kenya. Neth. Jl Zool. 25: 132–141.
5. Pickford, M., 1975. Late Miocene sediments and fossils from the Northern Kenya Rift Valley. Nature, 256: 279–284.
6. Pickford, M., 1975. Defensive stoning by baboons. Nature, 258: 550.
7. Bishop, W.W., Pickford, M., & Hill, A., 1975. New evidence regarding the Quaternary geology, archaeology and hominids of Chesowanja, Kenya. Nature, 258: 204–208.
8. Pickford, M., 1976. An upper Miocene pholidote from Pakistan. Pakistan Jl Zool. 8: 21–24.
9. Pickford, M., 1976. A new species of Taucanamo (Mammalia, Tayassuidae) from the Siwaliks of the Potwar Plateau, Pakistan. Pakistan Jl Zool. 8: 13–20.
10. Pickford, M., 1977. The status of Adaetontherium incognitum Lewis, 1934 from the middle Miocene of Pakistan. Tertiary Res. 1: 67–68.
11. Pilbeam, D., Barry, J., Meyer, G., Shah, S., Pickford, M., Bishop, W.W., Thomas, H., & Jacobs, L., 1977. Geology and palaeontology of Neogene strata of Pakistan. Nature, 270: 684–689.
12. Pilbeam, D., Meyer, G., Badgley, C., Rose, M., Pickford, M., Behrensmeyer, A.K., & Shah, S., 1977. New hominoid primates from the Siwaliks of Pakistan and their bearing on hominoid evolution. Nature, 270: 689–695.
13. Pickford, M., 1977. Prehuman fossils from Pakistan. New Scientist, 75 (1068): 578–580.
14. Pickford, M., 1978. Geology, palaeoenvironments and vertebrate faunas of the mid-Miocene Ngorora Formation, Kenya. In: W. W. Bishop (Ed.) Geological Background to fossil Man: 237–262, Edinburgh, Scottish Acad. Press.
15. Pickford, M., 1978. Stratigraphy and mammalian palaeontology of the late Miocene Lukeino Formation, Kenya. In: W. W. Bishop (Ed.) Geological background to fossil Man: 263–278, Edinburgh, Scottish Acad. Press.
16. Bishop, W.W., Hill, A., & Pickford, M., 1978. Chesowanja: A revised geological interpretation. In: W. W. Bishop (Ed.) Geological Background to Fossil Man: 309–327. Edinburgh, Scottish Acad. Press.
17. Pickford, M., 1978. The taxonomic status and distribution of Schizochoerus (Mammalia, Tayassuidae). Tertiary Res. 2: 29–38.
18. Pickford, M., 1978. New evidence concerning the fossil aardvarks (Mammalia, Tubulidentata) of Pakistan. Tertiary Res. 2: 39–44.
19. Pickford, M., 1979. New evidence pertaining to the Miocene Chalicotheriidae (Mammalia, Perissodactyla) of Kenya. Tertiary Res. 2: 83–92.
20. Pickford, M., & Erturk, C., 1979. Suidae and Tayassuidae from Turkey. Bull. Geol. Surv. Turkey, 22: 141–154.
21. Pickford, M., & Tassy, P., 1980. A new species of Zygolophodon (Mammalia, Proboscidea) from the Miocene hominoid localities of Meswa Bridge and Moroto (East Africa). N. Jb. Geol. Paläont. Abh. 4: 235–251.
22. Pickford, M., 1981. Parachleuastochoerus (Mammalia, Suidae). Estudios Geol. 37: 313–320.
23. Pickford, M., & Andrews, P., 1981. The Tinderet Miocene sequence in Kenya. Jl Human Evol. 10: 11–33.
24. Pickford, M., 1981. Preliminary Miocene Mammalian biostratigraphy for Western Kenya. Jl Human Evol. 10: 73–97.
25. Andrews, P., Harrison, T., Martin, L., & Pickford, M., 1981. Hominoid Primates from a new Miocene locality named Meswa Bridge in Kenya. Jl Human Evol. 10: 123–128.
26. Pickford, M., 1982. Report on invertebrates from Kirimun. In: H. Ishida & S. Ishida (Eds) Study of Tertiary Hominoids and their Palaeoenvironments in East Africa. 1: 140–145. Osaka, Osaka Univ. Press.
27. Pickford, M., 1982. Miocene Chalicotheriidae of the Potwar Plateau, Pakistan. Tertiary Res. 4: 13–29.
28. Pickford, M., 1982. The tectonics, volcanics and sediments of the Nyanza Rift Valley, Kenya. Z. Geomorph. N. F. 42: 1-33.
29. Pickford, M., 1982. New higher primate fossils from the middle Miocene deposits at Majiwa and Kaloma, Western Kenya. Am. Jl Phys. Anthropol. 58: 1–19.
30. Tassy, P., & Pickford, M., 1983. Un nouveau mastodonte zygolophodonte (Proboscidea, Mammalia) dans le Miocène inférieur d'Afrique orientale: systématique et paléoenvironnement. Geobios, 16: 53–77.
31. Pickford, M., 1983. On the origins of the Hippopotamidae together with a description of two new species, a new genus and a new subfamily from the Miocene of Kenya. Geobios, 1-6: 193–217.
32. Shipman, P., Potts, R., & Pickford, M., 1983. Lainyamok, a new middle Pleistocene hominid site. Nature, 305: 365–368.
33. Walker, A., Falk, D., Smith, R., & Pickford, M., 1983. The skull of Proconsul africanus: reconstruction and cranial capacity. Nature, 305: 525–527.
34. Walker, M., & Pickford, M., 1983. New postcranial fossils of Proconsul africanus and Proconsul nyanzae. In: R. Ciochon & R. Corruccini (Eds) New Interpretations of Ape and Human Ancestry: 325–351. New York, Plenum.
35. Pickford, M., 1983. Sequence and environments of the lower and middle Miocene hominoids of Western Kenya. In: R. Ciochon & R. Corruccini (Eds) New interpretations of ape and human ancestry: 421–439. New York, Plenum.
36. Pickford, M., Johanson, D., Lovejoy, C., White, T., & Aronson, J., 1983. A hominoid humeral fragment from the Pliocene of Kenya. Am. Jl Phys. Anthropol. 60: 337–346.
37. Pickford, M., 1983. An account of the new Kenyan fossil discoveries. Interim Evidence, 5 (2): 1–16. Pasadena, Leakey Foundation.
38. Pickford, M., 1984. A revision of the Sanitheriidae (Suiformes, Mammalia) Geobios, 17: 133–154.
39. Pickford, M., Ishida, H., Nakano, Y., & Nakaya, H., 1984. Fossiliferous localities of the Nachola-Samburu Hills area, Northern Kenya. African Studies Monogr. Suppl. 2: 45–56.
40. Pickford, M., Nakaya, H., Ishida, H., & Nakano, Y., 1984. The biostratigraphic analysis of the faunas of the Nachola area and the Samburu Hills, Northern Kenya. African Studies Monogr. Suppl. 2: 67–72.
41. Ishida, H., Pickford, M., Nakaya, H., & Nakano, Y., 1984. Fossil anthropoids from Nachola and Samburu Hills, Samburu District, Kenya. African Studies Monogr. Suppl. 2: 73–85.
42. Nakaya, H., Pickford, M., Nakano, Y., & Ishida, H., 1984. The late Miocene large mammal fauna from the Namurungule Formation, Samburu Hills, Northern Kenya. African Studies Monogr. Suppl. 2: 87–131.
43. Pickford, M., 1984. Fossil Mollusca from the Samburu Hills, Northern Kenya. African Studies Monogr. Suppl. 2: 141–145.
44. Pickford, M., 1984. Kenya Palaeontology Gazetteer. Kenya National Museums Spec. Publ. 1: 1–282.
45. Pickford, M., & Thomas, H., 1984. An aberrant new bovid (Mammalia) in subrecent deposits from Rusinga Island, Kenya Kon. Ned. Akad. Wet. B. 87: 441–452.
46. Pickford, M., 1985. L'écologie des premiers grands singes. La Recherche, 16: 188–198.
47. Pickford, M., 1985. Les ancêtres miocènes des grands singes et de l'homme. Encyclopédie Clartés, 3: 9–12.
48. Pickford, M., 1985. A new look at Kenyapithecus based on recent collections from Western Kenya. Jl Human Evol. 14: 113–143.
49. Pickford, M., 1985. On the status of Mabokopithecus clarki. Jl Human Evol. 14: 603–605.
50. Pickford, M., 1985. Kenyapithecus: A review of its status based on newly discovered fossils from Kenya. In: P. V. Tobias (Ed.) Hominid Evolution: Past, Present and Future: 107–112. New York, Alan Liss.
51. Pickford, M., 1986. A revision of the Miocene Suidae and Tayassuidae of Africa. Tertiary Res. Spec. Pap. 7: 1-83. 
52. Pickford, M., Senut, B., Hadoto, D., Musisi, J., & Kariira, C., 1986. Nouvelles découvertes dans le Miocène inférieur de Napak, Ouganda Oriental. C. R. Acad. Sci. Paris, 302: 47–52.
53. Pickford, M., Senut, B., Hadoto, D., Musisi, J., & Kariira, C., 1986. Découvertes récentes dans les sites miocènes de Moroto (Ouganda Oriental): aspects biostratigraphiques et paléoécologiques. C. R. Acad. Sci. Paris, 302: 681–686.
54. Pickford, M., 1986. Hominoids from the Miocene of East Africa and the phyletic position of Kenyapithecus. Z. Morph. Anthropol. 76: 117–130.
55. Pickford, M., 1986. Première découverte d'une faune mammalienne terrestre paléogène d'Afrique sub-saharienne. C. R. Acad. Sci. Paris, 302: 1205–1210.
56. Pickford, M., & Chiarelli, A.B., 1986. Sexual dimorphism in primates: where are we and where do we go from here? Human Evol. 1: 1–5.
57. Pickford, M., 1986. On the origins of body size dimorphism in primates. Human Evol. 1: 77–90.
58. Pickford, M., 1986. Sexual dimorphism in Proconsul. Human Evol. 1: 111–148.
59. Pickford, M., 1986. Sex differences in higher primates: a summary statement. In: M. Pickford & A. B. Chiarelli (Eds) Sexual Dimorphism in Living and Fossil Primates: 191–199. Firenze, Il Sedicesimo.
60. Pickford, M., & Chiarelli, A.B., 1986. (Eds) Sexual Dimorphism in Living and Fossil primates. Firenze, Il Sedicesimo.
61. Pickford, M., 1986. Dating the fossil primate record. In: J. Else & P. Lee (Eds) Primate Evolution: 1–2. Cambridge, Cambridge Univ. Press.
62. Pickford, M., 1986. The geochronology of Miocene higher primate faunas of East Africa. In: J. Else & P. Lee (Eds) Primate Evolution: 19–45. Cambridge, Cambridge Univ. Press.
63. Pickford, M., 1986. Geochronology of the Hominoidea: a summary. In: J. Else & P. Lee (Eds) Primate Evolution: 123–128. Cambridge, Cambridge Univ. Press.
64. Pickford, M., 1986. A reappraisal of Kenyapithecus. In: J. Else & P. Lee (Eds) Primate Evolution: 163–171. Cambridge, Cambridge Univ. Press.
65. Benefit, B., & Pickford, M., 1986. Miocene fossil cercopithecoids from Kenya. Am. Jl Phys. Anthropol. 69: 441–464.
66. Pickford, M., 1986. Major events in Primate palaeontology: possible support for climatic forcing models of evolution. Anthropologia contemporanea, 9 (2): 89–94.
67. Pickford, M., 1986. Snails. Anthroquest, 36: 3–5.
68. Pickford, M., 1986. Sedimentation and fossil preservation in the Nyanza Rift System, Kenya. In: L. Frostick et al. (Eds) Sedimentation in the African Rifts. Geol. Soc. Spec. Publ. 25: 345–362.
69. Pickford, M., 1986. Première découverte d'un Hyracoïde paléogène en Eurasie. C. R. Acad. Sci. Paris, 303: 1251–1254.
70. Pickford, M., 1986. Cainozoic palaeontological sites of Western Kenya. Münchner Geowiss. Abh. An 8: 1–151.
71. Pickford, M., 1986. Mollusca of Kora National reserve. In: M. Coe & N. M. Collins (Eds) Kora: An inventory of the Kora National Reserve, Kenya. Roy. Geogr. Soc. London, 1986: 225–232.
72. Pickford, M., 1986. From Kenyapithecus to Australopithecus. Abstr. 5 Congr. Europ. Anthropol. Soc. Lisbon. 1986: 81.
73. Pickford, M., 1986. Did Kenyapithecus utilise stones? Folia primat. 47: 1–7.
74. Pickford, M., 1987. Concordance entre la paléontologie continentale de l'Est Africain et les évènements paléo-océanographiques au Néogène. C. R. Acad. Sci. Paris. 304: 675–678.
75. Pickford, M., 1987. The geology and palaeontology of the Kanam erosion gullies (Kenya). Mainzer. Geowiss. Mitt. 16: 209–226.
76. Pickford, M., 1987. Biostratigraphy and palaeoecological significance of the Bugti faunas (Pakistan). Abstr. In: The Palaeoenvironment of East Asia from the Mid-Tertiary. Centre of Asian Studies, Univ. Hong Kong: 53–54.
77. Pickford, M., 1987. Implications of the Albertine (Uganda) fossil mollusc sequence C. R. Acad. Sci. Paris, 305: 317–322.
78. Pickford, M., & Fischer, M., 1987. Parapliohyrax ngororaensis, a new hyracoid from the Miocene of Kenya, with an outline of the classification of Neogene Hyracoidea. N Jb. Paläont. Abh. 175: 207–234.
79. Henderson, P., Pickford, M., & Williams, C.T., 1987. A geochemical study of rocks and spring waters at Kanam and Kanjera, Kenya and the implications concerning element mobility and uptake. Jl African Earth Sci. 6: 221–227.
80. Pickford, M., 1987. Dating of the cercopithecoid fossil record. Primate Report, 14: 47.
81. Pickford, M., 1987. Geochronology of East African Cercopithecoidea. Primate Report, 14: 47–48.
82. Pickford, M., 1987. The chronology of the Cercopithecoidea of East Africa. Human Evol. 2: 1–17.
83. Pickford, M., 1987. The diversity, zoogeography and geochronology of monkeys. Human Evol. 2: 71–89.
84. Pickford, M., 1987. The affinities of Sivaladapis, Indraloris and Sinoadapis. Human Evol. 2: 91–92.
85. Pickford, M., 1987. Recognition of an early Oligocene or late Eocene mammal fauna from Cabinda, Angola. Mus. R. Afr. Centr. Tervuren Ann. Rept. 1985-86: 89–92.
86. Pickford, M., 1987. Fossil Suidae from Ad Dabtiyah, Saudi Arabia. Bull. Br. Mus. Nat. Hist. (Geol.) 41: 441–446.
87. Pickford, M., & Rogers, D., 1987. Revision of the Bugti (Pakistan) Suiformes. C. R. Acad. Sci. Paris, 305: 643–646.
88. Senut, B., Pickford, M., Ssemmanda, I., Elepu, D., & Obwona, P., 1987. Découverte du premier Hominidae (Homo sp.) dans le Pléistocène de Nyabusosi (Ouganda occidental). C. R. Acad. Sci. Paris, 305: 819–822.
89. Pickford, M., 1987. Revision des Suiformes (Artiodactyla: Mammalia) de Bugti (Pakistan). Ann. Paléont. 73: 289-350 (lacking p. 48).
90. Pickford, M., 1987. Fort Ternan (Kenya) Palaeoecology. Jl Human Evol. 16: 305–307.
91. Pickford, M., 1987. Is there any geological evidence for an aquatic ape? Proc. and Abstr. 10th Meeting Congr. Europ. Sociobiol. Soc: 12–13.
92. Bernor, R., Brunet, M., Ginsburg, L., Mein, P., Pickford, M., Rögl, F., Sen. S., Steininger, F., & Thomas, H., 1987.  Remarques sur les principaux aspects de la chronologie mammalienne du Miocène de l'Ancien Monde: migrations et paléogéographie. Geobios, 20 (4): 431–439.
93. Pickford, M., 1987. Pre-hominids. 2 Congr. Int. Paléont. Humaine (Turin) Résumé: 5–9.
94. Pickford, M., 1987. Pre-hominid diversity and palaeogeography. 2 Congr. Int. Paléont. Humaine (Turin). Résumé, 12–14.
95. Pickford, M., 1987. Miocene Suidae from Arrisdrift, South West Africa. Namibia. Ann. S. Afr. Mus. 97: 283–295.
96. Pickford, M., 1987. Historical note: bioethics and conservation. Human Evol. 2: 283–284.
97. Pickford, M., Senut, B., Ssemmanda, I., Elepu, D., & Obwona, P., 1988. Premiers résultats de la mission de l'Uganda Palaeontology Expedition à Nkondo. C. R. Acad. Sci. Paris, 306: 315–320.
98. Pickford, M., 1988. The evolution of intelligence: a palaeontological perspective. In: H. Jerison & I. Jerison (Eds) Intelligence and Evolutionary Biology, NATO ASI Series G 17: 175–198.
99. Pickford, M., 1988. From Kenyapithecus to Australopithecus. Proc. 5 Congr. Europ. Anthropol. Assoc. Lisbon, 1: 7–11.
100. Pickford, M., 1988. The age(s) of the Bugti fauna(s). In: The Palaeoenvironment of East Asia from the mid-Tertiary, University of Hong Kong Press, 2: 937–955.
101. Pickford, M., & Senut, B., 1988. Habitat and locomotion in Miocene cercopithecoids. In: A. Gautier-Hion, F. Bourlière, J.-P. Gautier & J. Kingdon (Eds) A Primate radiation: 35–53. Cambridge, Cambridge Univ. Press.
102. Pickford, M., 1988. Revision of the Miocene Suidae of the Indian Subcontinent. Münchner Geowiss. Abh. 12: 1-91.
103. Pickford, M., & Mein, P., 1988. The discovery of fossiliferous Plio-Pleistocene cave fillings in Ngamiland, Botswana. C. R. Acad. Sci. Paris, 307: 1681–1686.
104. Pickford, M., 1988. Un étrange Suidé nain du Néogène supérieur de Langebaanweg (Afrique du Sud). Ann. Paléont. 74: 229–249.
105. Pickford, M., 1988. Major stages in the evolution of primate neurocrania. Human Evol. 3: 449–460.
106. Pickford, M., 1988. Geology and fauna of the Mid-Miocene Muruyur Beds, Baringo District, Kenya. Human Evol. 3: 381–390.
107. Drake, R., Van Couvering, J.A., Pickford, M., Curtis, G., & Harris, J.A., 1988. New chronology for the early Miocene mammalian faunas of Kisingiri, Western Kenya. Jl Geol. Soc. London. 145: 479–491.
108. Pickford, M., Senut, B., Roche, H., Mein, P., Ndaati, G., Obwona, P., & Tuhumwire, J., 1989. Uganda Palaeontology Expedition: résultats de la deuxième mission (1987) dans la région de Kisegi-Nyabusosi (Bassin du Lac Albert, Ouganda). C. R. Acad. Sci. Paris, 308: 1751–1758.
109. Moggi Cecchi, J., & Pickford, M., 1989. Une nouvelle technique non destructive de détermination de la structure prismatique de l'émail des dents chez les mammifères fossiles. C. R. Acad. Sci. Paris, 308: 1651–1654.
110. Pickford, M., 1989. Pre-hominids. In: Hominidae. Proc. 2nd Int. Congr. Human Palaeont. Turin: 23–33. Milan, Jaca Books.
111. Pickford, M., 1989. Pre-hominid diversity and palaeozoogeography. In: Hominidae, Proc. 2nd Int. Congr. Human Palaeont. :43-52. Milan, Jaca Books.
112. Pickford, M., 1989. Découverte d'un gisement exceptionnel. La Recherche, 20: 1497.
113. Pickford, M., 1989. Update on hippo origins. C. R. Acad. Sci. Paris, 309: 163–168.
114. Pickford, M., 1989. Evidence for climatic changes near the Miocene-Pliocene boundary in tropical Africa. Proc. Int. Congr. Mio-Pliocene Boundary, Faenza, Italy, 1988. Boll. Soc. Palaeont. Ital. 28: 317–320.
115. Pickford, M., 1989. New specimens of Nyanzachoerus waylandi (Mammalia, Tetraconodontinae) from the type area, Nyaburogo (Upper Miocene), Lake Albert Rift, Uganda. Geobios, 22: 641–651.
116. Pickford, M., & Morales, J., 1989. On the tayassuid affinities of Xenohyus, Ginsburg, 1980, and the description of new fossils from Spain. Estudios geol. 45: 233–237.
117. Pickford, M., 1990. Uplift of the Roof of Africa and its bearing on the evolution of mankind. Human Evol. 5: 1-20.
118. Pickford, M., 1990. Tempo and mode of molluscan evolution in the Pliocene of the Albertine Rift, Uganda-Zaire. C. R. Acad. Sci. Paris, 311: 1103–1109.
119. Pickford, M., 1990. Révision des Suidés de la Formation de Beglia (Tunisie). Ann. Paléont., 76: 133–141.
120. Pickford, M., 1990. Some fossiliferous Plio-Pleistocene cave systems of Ngamiland, Botswana. Botswana Notes and Records, 22: 1–15.
121. Pickford, M., 1990. Dynamics of Old World biogeographic realms during the Neogene: implications for biostratigraphy. In: E. Lindsay, V. Fahlbusch & P. Mein (Eds) European Neogene Mammal Chronology NATO ASI Series: 413–442. New York and London, Plenum.
122. Pickford, M., Fernandes, T., & Aço, S., 1990. Nouvelles découvertes de remplissages de fissures à primates dans le "Planalto da Humpata", Huilà, Sud de l'Angola. C. R. Acad. Sci. Paris, 310: 843–848.
123. Pickford, M., & Senut, B., 1990. Stratigraphy of the Western Rift Valley, Uganda-Zaire. In: Recent data in African Earth Sciences, CIFEG, Orléans: 221–225.
124. Pickford, M., Senut, B., Tiercelin, J.-J., Kasande, R., & Obwona, P., 1990. Résultats de la troisième mission (1988) de l'Uganda Palaeontology Expedition: régions de Nkondo-Sebugoro et de Hohwa (Bassin du Lac Albert, Ouganda). C. R. Acad. Sci. Paris, 311: 737-744.
125. Senut, B., Pickford, M., Bonnefille, R., Gayet, M., Roche, H., Kasande, R., & Obwona, P., 1990. Nouvelle découvertes paléontologiques, archéologiques et humaines dans le bassin du Lac Edouard, Ouganda. C. R. Acad. Sci. Paris, 311: 1111–1116.
126. Vanoverstraeten, M., Van Gysel, J., Tassy, P., Senut, B., & Pickford, M., 1990. Découverte d'une molaire éléphantine dans le Pliocène de la région d'Ishasha, Parc National des Virunga, sud du Lac Edouard, Province de Kivu, Zaïre. C. R. Acad. Sci. Paris, 311: 887–892.
127. Pickford, M., 1990. The discovery of Kenyapotamus in Tunisia. Ann. Paléont. 76: 277–283.
128. Petter, G., Pickford, M., & Howell, F.C., 1991. La loutre piscivore du Pliocène de Nyaburogo et de Nkondo (Ouganda, Afrique orientale): Torolutra ougandensis n.g., n.sp. (Mammalia, Carnivora). C. R. Acad. Sci. Paris, 312: 949–955.
129. Pickford, M., 1991. Growth of the Ruwenzoris and their impact on palaeoanthropology. In: Akiyoshi et al., (Eds) Primatology Today: 513–516. Amsterdam, Elsevier.
130. Jeddi, S., Pickford, M., Tassy, P., & Coppens, Y., 1991. Discovery of mammals in the Tertiary of Central Tunisia: biostratigraphic and palaeogeographic implications; C. R. Acad. Sci. Paris, 312: 543–548.
131. Pickford, M., 1991. Biostratigraphic correlation of the middle Miocene mammal locality of Jabal Zaltan, Libya. In: M. J. Salem (Ed.) The Geology of Libya, 4: 1483–1490. Amsterdam, Elsevier.
132. Pickford, M., 1991. Revision of the Neogene Anthracotheriidae of Africa. In: M. J. Salem (Ed.) The Geology of Libya, 4: 1491–1525. 
133. Pickford, M., 1991. Late Miocene anthracothere (Mammalia, Artiodactyla) from tropical Africa. C. R. Acad. Sci. Paris, 313: 709–715.
134. Pickford, M., 1991. What caused the first steps towards the evolution of walkie-talkie primates? In: Y. Coppens & B. Senut (Eds) Origine(s) de la Bipedie chez les Hominidés, Cah. PaléoAnthropol. CNRS, Paris: 275–293.
135. Pickford, M., 1991. Radiators and big brains in walkie-talkie primates. Behavioural and Brain Sci. 14 (3): 528–529.
136. Pickford, M., 1991. Paradise Lost: Mitochondrial Eve Refuted. Human Evolution, 6: 263–268.
137. Pickford M., & Senut, B., 1991. Découverte d'un pangolin géant pliocène en Ouganda. C. R. Acad. Sci. Paris, 313: 827–830.
138. Pickford, M., Senut, B., Poupeau, G., Brown, F., & Haileab, B., 1991. Correlation of tephra layers from the Western Rift Valley (Uganda) to the Turkana Basin (Ethiopia/Kenya) and the Gulf of Aden. C. R. Acad. Sci. Paris, 313: 223–229.
139. Pickford, M., Senut, B., Vincens, A., Van Neer, W., Ssemmanda, I., Baguma, Z., & Musiime, E., 1991. Nouvelle biostratigraphie du Néogène et du Quaternaire de la région de Nkondo (Bassin du Lac Albert, Rift occidental ougandais). Apport à l'évolution des paléomilieux. C. R. Acad. Sci. Paris, 312: 1667–1672.
140. Senut, B., Pickford, M., & Poupeau, G., 1991. Un désastre volcanique au Tertiare. La Recherche, 237: 1368–1370.
141. Pickford, 1991. Does the Geological Evidence support the Aquatic Ape Theory ? In: Roede, M., Wind, J., Patrick, J.M., & Reynolds, V., (Eds) The Aquatic Ape: Fact or Fiction? Souvenir Press (E&A) Ltd, pp. 127–132.
142. Dechamps, R., Senut, B., & Pickford, M., 1992. Fruits fossiles pliocènes et pléistocènes du Rift occidental ougandais: signification paléoenvironnementale. C. R. Acad. Sci. Paris, 314: 325–331.
143. Conroy, G., Pickford, M., Senut, B., Van Couvering, J., & Mein, P., 1992. Otavipithecus namibiensis, first Miocene hominoid from Southern Africa (Berg Aukas, Namibia). Nature, 356: 144–148.
144. Pickford, M., 1992. Biogeography of hominoids and hominids. In: T. Nishida, W. McGrew, P. Mahler, M. Pickford & F. DeWaal (Eds) Topics in Primatology: 371–391. University of Tokyo Press, Tokyo.
145. Pickford, M., Mein, P., & Senut, B., 1992. Primate bearing Plio-Pleistocene cave deposits of Humpata, Southern Angola. Human Evol. 7: 17–33.
146. Mein, P., & Pickford, M., 1992. Gisements karstiques pléistocènes au Djebel Ressas, Tunisie. C. R. Acad. Sci. Paris, 315: 247–253.
147. Pickford, M., Senut, B., Ambrosi, J.-P., Dechamps, R., Faure, M., Van Damme, D., Texier, P.-J., Baguma, Z., & Musiime, E., 1992. Révision de la biostratigraphie du Néogène du Rift Occidental (Ouganda-Zaïre). C. R. Acad. Sci. Paris, 315: 1289–1292.
148. Senut, B., Pickford, M., Mein, P., Conroy, G., & Van Couvering, J. 1992. Découverte de douze sites fossilifères néogènes dans les paléokarsts des Monts Otavi en Namibie. C. R. Acad. Sci. Paris, 314: 727-733.
149. Pickford, M., 1992. Evidence for an arid climate in Western Uganda during the middle Miocene. C. R. Acad. Sci. Paris, 315: 1419–1424.
150. Conroy, G., Pickford, M., Senut, B., Van Couvering, J., & Mein, P., 1992. The Otavi Mountain Land of Namibia yields Southern Africa's first Miocene hominoid. Research and Exploration Natl Geog. Soc. 8 (4): 492–494.
151. Pickford, M., 1993. Climatic change, biogeography, and Theropithecus. In: N. Jablonski (Ed.) Theropithecus: the rise and fall of a primate genus: 227–243. Cambridge, Cambridge Univ. Press
152. Morales, J., Pickford, M., & Soria, D., 1993. Pachyostosis in a lower Miocene Giraffoid from Spain, Lorancameryx pachyostoticus nov. gen. nov. sp., and its bearing on the evolution of bony appendages in artiodactyls. Geobios, 26 (2): 207–230.
153. Pickford, M., 1993. Otavipithecus and the interface between science and journalism. S. Afr. Jl Sci. 89: 174.
154. Ward, J.D., Corbett, I., Pickford, M., & Senut, B., 1993. Terrestrial gastropods in the southern Namib: evidence for winter rainfall in the Miocene? SASQUA.
155. Pickford, M., & Dauphin, Y., 1993. Diamantornis wardi, nov. gen., nov. sp., giant extinct bird from Roilepel, lower Miocene, Namibia. C. R. Acad. Sci. Paris, 316: 1643–1650.
156. Pickford, M., 1993. Age of supergene ore bodies at Berg Aukas and Harasib 3a, Namibia. Extended Abstr. 16th Coll. Afr. Geol. Mbabane, Swaziland, 2: 273–274.
157. Pickford, M., Senut, B., & Hadoto, D., 1993. Geology and Palaeobiology of the Albertine Rift Valley, Uganda-Zaire, Orléans, CIFEG. Publ Occas. 1993/24: 1–190.
158. Conroy, G.C., Pickford, M., Senut, B., & Mein, P., 1993. Diamonds in the desert: the discovery of Otavipithecus namibiensis. Evolutionary Anthropology: 46–52, Wiley-Liss, Inc.
159. Pickford, M., 1993. Age of supergene ore bodies at Berg Aukas and Harasib 3a, Namibia. Communs Geol. Surv. Namibia, 8: 147–150.
160. Conroy, G., Pickford, M., Senut, B., & Mein, P., 1993. Additional Miocene primates from the Otavi Mountains, Namibia. C. R. Acad. Sci. Paris, 317: 987–990.
161. Pickford, M., Senut, B., Mein, P., & Conroy, G., 1993. Premiers gisements fossilifères post-miocènes dans le Kaokoland, nord-ouest de la Namibie. C. R. Acad. Sci. Paris, 317: 719–720.
161bis. Pickford, M., Morales, J., & Soria, D., 1993. First fossil camels from Europe. Nature, 365: 701.
162. Pickford, M., Senut, B., & Dauphin, Y., 1993. Chronologie du Néogène continental de Namibie: apport des oeufs fossiles. Palaeovox, 2: 66–67.
163. Pickford, M., 1993. Old World Suoid systematics, phylogeny, biogeography and biostratigraphy. Paleontologia i Evolució, 26-27: 237–269.
164. Senut, B., Pickford, M., & Ward, J.D., 1994. Biostratigraphie des éolianites néogènes du Sud de la Sperrgebiet (Désert de Namib, Namibie). C. R. Acad. Sci. Paris, Sér. II, 318: 1001–1007.
165. Pickford, M., Mein, P., & Senut, B., 1994. Fossiliferous Neogene karst fillings in Angola, Botswana and Namibia. S. Afr. Jl Sci. 90: 227–230.
166. Pickford, M., Thomas, H., Sen, S., Roger, J., Gheerbrant, E., & Al-Sulaimani, Z., 1994. Early Oligocene Hyracoidea (Mammalia) from Thaytiniti and Taqah, Dhofar Province, Sultanate of Oman. C. R. Acad. Sci. Paris Sér. II, 318: 1395–1400.
167. Pickford, M., 1994. Patterns of sedimentation and fossil distribution in the Kenya Rift Valleys. Jl African Earth Sci. 18: 51–60.
168. Pickford, M., 1994. Otavi and Nama Palaeontology. Abstr. Proterozoic Crustal and Metallogenic Evolution. Geol. Surv. Namibia 1994: 55.
169. Petter, G., Pickford, M., & Senut, B., 1994. Présence du genre Agriotherium (Mammalia, Carnivora, Ursidae) dans le Miocène terminal de la Formation de Nkondo (Ouganda, Afrique orientale). C. R. Acad. Sci. Paris, 319: 713–717.
170. Pickford, M., Senut, B., Conroy, G., & Mein, P., 1994. Phylogenetic position of Otavipithecus: Questions of methodology and approach. In: B. Thierry, J. R. Anderson, J. J. Roeder, & N. Herrenschmidt (Eds) Current Primatology, 1: 265-272 Ecology and Evolution, Université Louis Pasteur, Strasbourg.
171. Pickford, M., & Thomas, H., 1994. Sexual dimorphism in Moeripithecus markgrafi from the early Oligocene of Taqah, Oman. In: B. Thierry, J. R. Anderson, J. J. Roeder, & N. Herrenschmidt (Eds) Current Primatology, 1: 261-264 Ecology and Evolution, Université Louis Pasteur, Strasbourg.
172. Pickford, M., 1994. Namibia's Triassic Park. Rössing Magazine October, 1994: 6–11.
173. Pickford, M., & Moya Sola, S., 1994. Taucanamo (Suoidea, Tayassuidae) from the Middle Miocene (MN04a) of Els Casots, Barcelona, Spain. C. R. Acad. Sci. Paris, 319: 1569–1575.
174. Pickford, M., and Morales, J., 1994. Biostratigraphy and palaeobiogeography of East Africa and the Iberian Peninsula. Palaeogeogr. Palaeoclimatol. Palaeoecol. 112: 297–322.
175. Pickford, M., 1994. A new field for vertebrate palaeontology in Africa. Roan News, Spring, 1994: 10–11.
176. Senut, B., & Pickford, M., 1994. Geology and palaeobiology of the Albertine Rift Valley, Uganda-Zaire. Vol. 2: Palaeobiology-Paléobiologie. Occas. Publ. CIFEG, 29: 1–424.
177. Pickford, M., & Senut, B., 1994. Palaeobiology of the Albertine Rift Valley, Uganda-Zaire. In: B. Senut, & M. Pickford (Eds). Geology and palaeobiology of the Albertine Rift Valley, Uganda-Zaire. Vol. 2: Palaeobiology-Paléobiologie. Occas. Publ. CIFEG, 29: 9-27.
178. Van Damme, D., & Pickford, M., 1994. The Late Cenozoic freshwater molluscs of the Albertine Rift, Uganda-Zaire: Evolutionary and palaeoecological implications. In: B. Senut, & M. Pickford (Eds). Geology and palaeobiology of the Albertine Rift Valley, Uganda-Zaire. Vol. 2: Palaeobiology-Paléobiologie. Occas. Publ. CIFEG, 29: 71–87.
179. Pickford, M., 1994. Late Cenozoic crocodiles (Reptilia: Crocodylidae) from the Western Rift, Uganda-Zaire. In: B. Senut, & M. Pickford (Eds). Geology and palaeobiology of the Albertine Rift Valley, Uganda-Zaire. Vol. 2: Palaeobiology-Paléobiologie. Occas. Publ. CIFEG, 29: 137–155.
180. Pickford, M., 1994. Tubulidentata of the Albertine Rift Valley, Uganda. In: B. Senut, & M. Pickford (Eds). Geology and palaeobiology of the Albertine Rift Valley, Uganda-Zaire. Vol. 2: Palaeobiology-Paléobiologie. Occas. Publ. CIFEG, 29: 261–262.
181. Pickford, M., & Senut, B., 1994. Fossil Pholidota of the Albertine Rift Valley, Uganda. In: B. Senut, & M. Pickford (Eds). Geology and palaeobiology of the Albertine Rift Valley, Uganda-Zaire. Vol. 2: Palaeobiology-Paléobiologie. Occas. Publ. CIFEG, 29: 259–260.
182. Pickford, M., 1994. Anthracotheriidae from the Albertine Rift Valley. In: B. Senut, & M. Pickford (Eds). Geology and palaeobiology of the Albertine Rift Valley, Uganda-Zaire. Vol. 2: Palaeobiology-Paléobiologie. Occas. Publ. CIFEG, 29: 309–319.
183. Pickford, M., 1994. Fossil Suidae of the Albertine Rift Valley, Uganda-Zaire. In: B. Senut, & M. Pickford (Eds). Geology and palaeobiology of the Albertine Rift Valley, Uganda-Zaire. Vol. 2: Palaeobiology-Paléobiologie. Occas. Publ. CIFEG, 29: 339–373.
184. Pickford, M., & Senut, B., 1994. Palaeobiology of the Albertine Rift Valley: general conclusions and synthesis. In: B. Senut, & M. Pickford (Eds). Geology and palaeobiology of the Albertine Rift Valley, Uganda-Zaire. Vol. 2: Palaeobiology-Paléobiologie. Occas. Publ. CIFEG, 29: 409–423.
185. Pickford, M., 1994. A new species of Prohyrax (Mammalia, Hyracoidea) from the middle Miocene of Arrisdrift, Namibia. Communs. geol. Surv. Namibia, 9: 43–62.
186. Oslisly, R., Pickford, M., Dechamps, R., Fontugne, M., & Maley, J., 1994. Sur une présence humaine mi-holocène à caractère rituel en grottes au Gabon. C. R. Acad. Sci. Paris Sér. II, 319: 1423–1428.
187. Roger, J., Pickford, M., Thomas, H., de Broin, F., Tassy, P., Van Neer, W., Bourdillon-de-Grissac, C., & Al-Busaidi, S., 1994. Découverte de vertébrés fossiles dans le Miocène de la région du Huqf au Sultanat d'Oman. Ann. Paléont. 80: 253–273.
188. Senut, B., Pickford, M., & Dauphin, Y., 1995. Découverte d'oeufs de type "Aepyornithoïde" dans le Miocène inférieur de Namibie. C. R. Acad. Sci. Paris, 320: 71–76.
189. Pickford, M., Senut, B., and Dauphin, Y., 1995. Biostratigraphy of the Tsondab Sandstone (Namibia) based on gigantic avian eggshells. Geobios, 28 (1): 85–98.
190. Pickford, M., 1995. Fossil land snails of East Africa and their palaeoecological significance. Jl Afr. Earth Sci. 20 (3-4): 167–226.
191. Pickford M., 1995. Suidae (Mammalia, Artiodactyla) from the early Middle Miocene of Arrisdrift, Namibia: Namachoerus (gen. nov.) moruoroti, and Nguruwe kijivium. C. R. Acad. Sci. Paris, 320, II a, 319–326.
192. Pickford M., & Senut, B., 1995. Diamond birds in the Sperrgebiet. Optima, May, 1995: 24–25.2
193. Pickford, M., Morales, J., & Soria, D., 1995. Fossil camels from the Upper Miocene of Europe: Implications for biogeography and faunal change. Geobios 28 (5): 641–650.
194. Senut, B., Pickford, M., & Mein, P., 1995. Les falaises d'Awasib: une coupe-type pour le Cénozoïque continental de Namibie. C. R. Acad. Sci. Paris, Sér. 2, 321: 775–780.
195. Berger, L., Pickford, M., & Thackeray, F., 1995. A Plio-Pleistocene hominid upper central incisor from the Cooper's Site, South Africa. S. Afr. Jl Sci. 91: 541–542.
196. Morales, J., Soria, D., & Pickford, M., 1995. Sur les origines de la famille des Bovidae (Artiodactyla, Mammalia). C. R. Acad. Sci. Paris, 321: 1211–1217.
197. Pickford, M., 1995. Palaeontology. In: J. Pallet (Ed.) The Sperrgebiet: Namibia's Least Known Wilderness. pp. 33–37. Windhoek, DRFN & NAMDEB Typoprint.
198. Pickford, M., & Moya Sola, S., 1995. Eurolistriodon gen. nov. (Suoidea, Mammalia) from Els Cassots, early middle Miocene, Spain. Proc. Kon. Ned. Akad. v. Wetensch. 98 (4): 343–360.
199. Senut, B., & Pickford, M., 1995. Fossil eggs and Cenozoic continental biostratigraphy of Namibia. Palaeont. afr. 32: 33–37.
200. Pickford, M., 1995. Karoo Supergroup palaeontology of Namibia and brief description of a thecodont from Omingonde. Palaeont. afr. 32: 51–66.
201. Corbett, I., Ward, J., Pickford, M., & McMillan, I., 1995. Applications of sequence stratigraphy to the high-energy, arid continental margin of south-western Africa. Centennial Geocongress (1995) Geol. Soc. S. Afr. p 871, Rand Afrikaans Univ. Johannesburg, S. Afr.
202. Van Damme, D., & Pickford, M., 1995. The late Cenozoic Ampullariidae (Mollusca, Gastropoda) of the Albertine Rift Valley (Uganda-Zaire). Hydrobiologia, 316: 1-32.
203. Pickford, M., Senut, B., Mein, P., Morales, J., Soria, D., Nieto, M., Ward, J., & Bamford, M., 1995. The discovery of lower and middle Miocene vertebrates at Auchas, southern Namibia. C. R. Acad. Sci. Paris, 322: 901–906.
204. Pickford, M., 1995. Review of the Riphean, Vendian and early Cambrian palaeontology of the Otavi and Nama Groups, Namibia. Communs. Geol. Surv. Namibia. 10: 57–82.
205. Conroy, G., Senut, B., Gommery, D., Pickford, M., & Mein, P., 1996. New primate remains from the Miocene of Namibia, Southern Africa. Am. Jl Phys. Anthropol. 99: 487–492.
206. Pickford, M., 1996. Pliohyracids (Mammalia, Hyracoidea) from the upper Middle Miocene at Berg Aukas, Namibia. C. R. Acad. Sci. Paris, 322: 501–505.
207. Pickford, M., 1996. Tubulidentata (Mammalia) from the Middle and Upper Miocene of southern Namibia. C. R. Acad. Sci. Paris, 322: 805–810.
208. Pickford, M., Senut, B., Mein, P., Gommery, D., Morales, J., Soria, D., Nieto, M., & Ward, J., 1996. Preliminary results of new excavations at Arrisdrift, middle Miocene of southern Namibia. C. R. Acad. Sci. Paris, 322: 991–996.
209. David, H., Dauphin, Y., Pickford, M., & Senut, B., 1996. Conservation de sucres dans les phases organiques d'os de bovidés fossiles. Bull. Mus. Nat. Hist. Nat. 4 sér. 18: 403–415.
210. Pickford, M., 1996. Earth expansion, Plate Tectonics and Gaia's pulse. Bull. Mus. Nat. Hist. Nat. 4 sér. 18: 451–516.
211. Senut, B., Pickford, M., de Wit, M., Ward, J., Spaggiari, R., & Morales, J., 1996. Biochronology of sediments at Bosluis Pan, Northern Cape Province, South Africa. S. Afr. Jl Sci. 92: 249–251.
212. Rasmussen, D.T., Pickford, M., Mein, P., Senut, B., & Conroy, G., 1996. Earliest known procaviid hyracoid from the Late Miocene of Namibia. Jl Mammalogy, 77 (3): 745–754.
213. Pickford, M., 1996. Earth Expansion and Plate Tectonics: historical review, comparison and discussion. S. Afr. Jl Sci. 92: 365–370.
214. Dauphin, Y., Pickford, M., & Senut, B., 1996. Microstructures des coquilles d'oeufs d'oiseaux fossiles de Namibie. Revue de Paléobiologie, 15: 225–241.
215. Mourer-Chauviré, C., Senut, B., Pickford, M., & Mein, P., 1996. Le plus ancien représentant du genre Struthio (Aves, Struthionidae), Struthio coppensi n. sp., du Miocène inférieur de Namibie. C. R. Acad. Sci. Paris, 322: 325–332.
216. Mourer-Chauviré, C., Senut, B., Pickford, M., Mein, P., & Dauphin, Y., 1996. Ostrich eggs, legs and phylogenies. S. Afr. Jl Sci. 92: 492–495.
217. Pickford, M., 1996. Fossil Crocodiles (Crocodylus lloydi) from the Lower and Middle Miocene of Southern Africa. Annales de Paléontologie, 82: 235–250.
218. Pickford, M., 1997. Interplay between global tectonics and the palaeobiosphere during the Cainozoic. In: E. Aguirre, J. Morales & D. Soria (Eds) Registros fosiles e historia de la Tierra, pp. 27–55. Madrid, Edit. Complutense.
219. Pickford, M., 1997. Hominoid evolution in African Neogene environments. In: E. Aguirre, J. Morales & D. Soria (Eds) Registros fosiles e historia de la Tierra, pp. 367–382. Madrid, Edit. Complutense.
220. Pickford, M., 1997. Lower Miocene Suiformes from the northern Sperrgebiet, Namibia, including new evidence for the systematic position of the Sanitheriidae. C. R. Acad. Sci. Paris, 325: 285–292.
221. Pickford, M., Moya Sola, S., & Köhler, M., 1997. Phylogenetic implications of the first African Middle Miocene hominoid frontal bone from Otavi, Namibia. C. R. Acad. Sci. Paris, 325: 459–466.
222. Pickford, M., Moya Sola, S., & Mein, P., 1997. A revised phylogeny of Hyracoidea (Mammalia) based on new specimens of Pliohyracidae from Africa and Europe. N. Jb. Geol. Paläont. Abh. 205: 265–288.
223. Senut, B., & Pickford, M., 1997. Prehistoric Safari. EWI-Namdeb.  3rd Quarter, 1997: 10–13.
224. Senut, B., Pickford, M., & Wessels, D., 1997. Pan-African distribution of Lower Miocene Hominoidea. C. R. Acad. Sci. Paris, 325: 741–746.
225. Ishida, H., & Pickford, M., 1997. A new late Miocene hominoid from Kenya: Samburupithecus kiptalami gen. et sp. nov. C. R. Acad. Sci. Paris, 325: 823–829.
226. Pickford, M., 1997. Nous descendons des grands singes africains. Historia Spécial, 50: 30–33.
227. Pickford, M., & Senut, B., 1997. Cainozoic mammals from coastal Namaqualand, South Africa. Palaeont. afr. 34: 199–217.
228. Pickford, M., 1997. Reply to Van der Made, 1995. Paleontologia i Evolució. 30-31: 269–274.
229. Pickford, M., & Ishida, H., 1998. Interpretation of Samburupithecus, an upper Miocene hominoid from Kenya. C. R. Acad. Sci. Paris. 326: 299–306.
230. Pickford, M., 1998. Onland Tertiary marine strata in southwestern Africa: eustasy, local tectonics and epeirogenesis in a passive continental margin setting. S. Afr. Jl Sci. 94: 5–8.
231. Dauphin, Y., Pickford, M., & Senut, B., 1998. Diagenetic changes in the mineral and organic phases of fossil avian eggshells from Namibia. Applied Geochem. 13: 243–256.
232. Sawada, Y., Pickford, M., Itaya, T., Makinouchi, T, Tateishi, M., Kabeto, K., Ishida, S., & Ishida, H., 1998. K-Ar ages of Miocene Hominoidea (Kenyapithecus and Samburupithecus) from Samburu Hills, Northern Kenya. C. R. Acad. Sci. Paris, 326: 445–451.
233. Morales, J., Pickford, M., Soria, D., & Fraile, S., 1998. New carnivores from the basal Middle Miocene of Arrisdrift, Namibia. Eclog. Geol. Helv. 91: 27–40.
234. Pickford, M., & Senut, B., 1998. Orange River Man, an archaic Homo sapiens from Namibia. S. Afr. Jl Sci. 94: 312.
235. Pickford, M., & Morales, J., 1998. A tubulidentate suiform lineage (Tayassuidae, Mammalia) from the early Miocene of Spain. C. R. Acad. Sci. Paris, 327: 285–290.
236. Morales, J., Pickford, M., Soria, D., Fraile, S., & Nieto, M., 1998. Carnivore faunas of the early Miocene of Africa. Abstr. Palaeont. Soc. S. Afr. 1998, Windhoek pp. 19–20.
237. Pickford, M., 1998. Seven palaeo-years in the Sperrgebiet, Namibia.  Abstr. Palaeont. Soc. S. Afr. 1998, Windhoek p. 23.
238. Pickford, M., 1998. Dating of the Neogene Old World anthropoid fossil record: essential base for phylogenetic analysis, biogeography and palaeoecology. Primatologie. 1: 27–92.
239. Pickford, M., 1998. Nous descendons des grands singes africains. Les Dossiers Historia, pp. 48–53. Tallandier, Paris.
240. Morales, J., Pickford, M., & Soria, D., 1998. A new creodont Metapterodon stromeri nov. sp. (Hyaenodontidae, Mammalia) from the early Miocene of Langental (Sperrgebiet, Namibia). C. R. Acad. Sci. Paris. 327: 633–638.
241. Senut, B., Dauphin, Y., & Pickford, M., 1998. Nouveaux restes aviens du Néogène de la Sperrgebiet (Namibie): complémént à la biostratigraphie avienne des éolianites du désert de Namib.  C. R. Acad. Sci. Paris. 327: 639–644.
242. Pickford, M., 1998. A new genus of Tayassuidae (Mammalia) from the middle Miocene of Uganda and Kenya. Ann. Paléont. 84: 275–285.
243. Gommery, D., Senut, B., & Pickford, M. 1998. Nouveaux restes postcrâniens d'Hominoidea du Miocène inférieur de Napak, Ouganda. Ann. Paléont. 84: 287–306.
244. Pickford, M., Senut, B., & Gommery, D., 1999. Sexual dimorphism in Morotopithecus bishopi, an early Middle Miocene hominoid from Uganda and a reassessment of its geological and biological contexts. In: P. Andrews, & P. Banham, (Eds) Late Cenozoic Environments and Hominid Evolution: a tribute to Bill Bishop. Geological Society, London, pp. 27–38.
245. Van Damme, D., & Pickford, M., 1999. The Late Cenozoic Viviparidae (Mollusca, Gastropoda) of the Albertine Rift Valley (Uganda-Zaire). Hydrobiologia, 390: 169–215.
246. Pickford, M., 1999. Palaeoenvironments and hominoid locomotion. Abstr. Internat. Workshop Arboreal Locomotor Adaptation in Primates and its Relevance to Human Evolution. Kyoto Univ. 5–7 March 1999, pp. 33–35.
247. Morales, J., Soria, D., & Pickford, M., 1999. New stem giraffoid ruminants from the Lower and Middle Miocene of Namibia. Geodiversitas, 21: 229–254.
248. Pickford, M., 1999. Aubréville's hypothesis of a southwards shift of Africa's vegetation belts since the Miocene. In: F. Maes & H. Beeckman (Eds) Wood to survive, Liber Amicorum Roger Dechamps. Ann. Sci. Econ. Mus. R. Afr. Centr. Tervuren. 25: 195–212.
249. David, H., Dauphin, Y., Gautret, P., Pickford, M., & Senut, B., 1999. Composition en acides aminés d'os de mammifères fossiles de deux sites du Plio-Pleistocène d'Angola. Comparaison avec la conservation de la phase minérale. Geodiversitas, 21: 215–228.
250. Nakaya, H., Pickford, M., Yasui, K., & Nakano, Y., 1999 (misdated 1987). Additional large mammalian fauna from the Namurungule Formation, Samburu Hills, Northern Kenya. Afr. Study Monogr. Suppl. Issue, 5: 79–130.
251. Pickford, M., Ishida, H., Nakano, Y., & Yasui, Y., 1999 (misdated 1987). The Middle Miocene Fauna from the Nachola and Aka Aiteputh Formations, Northern Kenya. Afr. Study Monogr. Suppl. Issue, 5: 141–154.
252. Pickford, M., 1999 (misdated 1987). Fossil terrestrial gastropods from the Namurungule Formation, Kenya. Afr. Study Monogr. Suppl. Issue, 5: 155–156.
253. Gommery, D., Senut, B., Pickford, M., Kamuhangire, E., Ssemmanda, I., & Musiime, E., 1999. Les Hominoïdes du Karamoja. Archéologia, 360: 52–57.
254. Pickford, M., Eisenmann, V., & Senut, B., 1999. Timing of landscape development and calcrete pedogenesis in northern Namaqualand, South Africa. S. Afr Jl Sci. 95: 357–359.
255. Thomas, H., Roger, J., Sen, S., Pickford, M., Gheerbrant, E., Al-Sulaimani, Z., & Al-Busaidi, S., 1999. Oligocene and Miocene terrestrial vertebrates in the southern Arabian Peninsula (Sultanate of Oman) and their geodynamic and palaeogeographic settings. In: P. Whybrow, & A. Hill, (Eds) Fossil Vertebrates of Arabia, pp. 430–442. New Haven, Yale University Press.
256. Pickford, M., & Senut, B., 1999. Geology and Palaeobiology of the Namib Desert, Southwestern Africa. Mem. Geol. Surv. Namibia. 18: 1–155.
257. Pickford, M., Gabunia, L., Mein, P., Morales, J., & Azanza, B., 2000. The Middle Miocene Mammalian Site of Belometchetskaya, North Caucasus: an important biostratigraphic link between Europe and China. Geobios, 33: 257–267.
258. Senut, B., Pickford, M., Braga, J., Marais, D., & Coppens, Y., 2000. Découverte d'un Homo sapiens archaïque à Oranjemund, Namibie. C. R. Acad. Sci. Paris, 330: 813–819.
259. Pickford, M., 2000. Crocodiles from the Beglia Formation, Middle/Late Miocene Boundary, Tunisia, and their significance for Saharan palaeoclimatology. Ann. Paléont. 86: 59–67.
260. Senut, B., Pickford, M., Gommery, D., & Kunimatsu, Y., 2000. A new genus of Early Miocene hominoid from East Africa: Ugandapithecus major (Le Gros Clark & Leakey, 1950). C. R. Acad. Sci. Paris, 331: 227–233.
261. Pickford, M., 2000. Fossil spider's webs from the Namib Desert and the antiquity of Seothyra (Araneae, Eresidae). Ann. Paléont. 86: 147–155.
262. Morales, J., Pickford, M., Salesa, M., & Soria, D., 2000. The systematic status of Kelba, Savage, 1965, Kenyalutra, Schmidt-Kittler, 1987 and Ndamathaia, Jacobs et al., 1987, (Viverridae, Mammalia) and a review of Early Miocene mongoose-like carnivores of Africa. Ann. Paléont. 86: 243–251.
263. Pickford, M., & Senut, B., 2001. The geological and faunal context of Late Miocene hominid remains from Lukeino, Kenya. C. R. Acad. Sci. Paris, 332: 145–152.
264. Senut, B., Pickford, M., Gommery, D., Mein, P., Cheboi, K., & Coppens, Y., 2001. First hominid from the Miocene (Lukeino Formation, Kenya). C. R. Acad. Sci. Paris, 332: 137–144.
265. Pickford, M., 2001. The biochronological importance of Kubanochoerinae (Mammalia, Suidae) together with a description of new material of Megalochoerus khinzikebirus and Libycochoerus massai from Kenya. C. R. Acad. Sci. Paris, 332: 193–200.
266. Pickford, M., & Senut, B., 2001. 'Millenium Ancestor', a 6-million-year-old bipedal hominid from Kenya. S. Afr. Jl Sci. 97: 22.
267. Pickford, M., 2001. Afrochoerodon nov. gen. kisumuensis (MacInnes) (Proboscidea, Mammalia) from Cheparawa, Middle Miocene, Kenya. Ann. Paléont. 87(2): 99–117. 
268. Pickford, M., 2001. Equidae in the Ngorora Formation, Kenya, and the first appearance of the family in East Africa. Paleontologia i Evolució, 32-33: 71–78.
269. Pickford, M., 2001. The geological context of the Kanapoi fossil hominids. Human Evolution, 16(1): 45–48.
270. Pickford, M., & Liu Liping, 2001. Revision of the Miocene Suidae of Xiaolongtan (Kaiyuan), China. Bol. Soc. Paleont. Ital. 40(2): 275–283.
271. Pickford, M., 2001. New species of Listriodon (Suidae, Mammalia) from Bartule, Member A, Ngorora Formation (ca 13 Ma), Tugen Hills, Kenya. Ann. Paléont. 87: 209–223.
272. Pickford, M., 2001. The status of Sus giganteus Falconer & Cautley, 1847 (Mammalia: Suinae) from the Indian Subcontinent. Trans. R. Soc. Edinburgh, 92(1): 39–42.
273. Morales, J., Salesa, M., Pickford, M., & Soria, D., 2001. A new tribe, new genus and two new species of Barbourofelinae (Felidae, Carnivora, Mammalia) from the Early Miocene of East Africa and Spain. Trans. R. Soc. Edinburgh, 92(1): 97–102.
274. Pickford, M., 2001. Equidae in the Ngorora Formation, Kenya, and the first appearance of the family in East Africa. Rev. Esp. Paleont. 16: 339–345.
275. Pickford, M., 2001. Beyond Plate Tectonics. In: Y. Coppens (Ed.) Origine de l'Homme: Réalité, Mythe, Mode.  pp. 57–76, Collège de France, Ed Artcom.
276. Pickford, M., 2001. Africa's smallest ruminant: a new tragulid from the Miocene of Kenya and the biostratigraphy of East African Tragulidae. Geobios, 34: 437–447.
277. Pickford, M., & Gupta, S.S., 2001. New specimens of Conohyus indicus (Lydekker, 1884) (Mammalia: Suidae) from Jammu, India. Ann. Paléont. 87(4): 271–281.
278. Pickford, M., Attia, Y.S., & Abd el Ghany, M.S., 2001. Discovery of Prolibytherium magnieri (Climacoceratidae, Artiodactyla) in Egypt. Geodiversitas, 23(4): 647–652.
279. Morales, J., Pickford, M., Soria, D., & Fraile, S., 2001. New Viverrinae (Carnivora, Mammalia) from the basal Middle Miocene of Arrisdrift, (Namibia) and a reassessment of the early Miocene mongoose-like carnivores of Africa. Palaeont. afr. 37: 99–102.
280. Sawada, Y., Miura, T., Pickford, M., Senut, B., Itaya, T., Kashine, C., Hyodo, M., Chujo, T., & Fujii, H., 2001. The age of Orrorin tugenensis, a late Miocene hominid from the Tugen Hills, Kenya. Abstr. Ann. Meeting Geol. Soc. Japan. Nagoya, 26–27 May 2001. 
281. Pickford, M., 2002. Palaeoenvironments and hominoid evolution. Z. Morph. Anthropol. 83: 337–349.
282. Mein, P., Pickford, M., & Senut, B., 2002. Late Miocene micromammals from the Harasib karst deposits, Namibia, Part 1. Large muroids and non-muroid rodents. Communs Geol. Surv. Namibia, 12: 375–390.
283.  Mein, P., Pickford, M., & Senut, B., 2002. Late Miocene micromammals from the Harasib karst deposits, Namibia, Part 2a. Myocricetodontinae, Petromyscinae and Namibimyinae (Rodentia, Gerbillidae) Communs Geol. Surv. Namibia, 12: 391–401.
284. Pickford, M., 2002. Neogene and Quaternary vertebrate biochronology of the Sperrgebiet and Otavi Mountainland, Namibia. Communs Geol. Surv. Namibia, 12: 359–365.
285. Pickford, M., & Senut, B., 2002. The Fossil Record of Namibia. Geological Survey, Namibia, Namprint, Windhoek, 39 pp.
286. Liu Liping, Fortelius, M., & Pickford, M., 2002. New fossil Suidae from Shanwang, Shandong, China. Jl Vert. Paleont. 22: 152–163.
287. Segalen, L., Renard, M., Pickford, M., Senut, B., Cojan, I., Le Callonec, L., & Rognon, P., 2002. Environmental and climatic evolution of the Namib Desert since the Middle Miocene: the contribution of carbon isotope ratios in ratite eggshells. C. R. Geoscience, 334: 917–924.
288. Pickford, M., Senut, B., Gommery, D., & Treil, J., 2002. Bipedalism in Orrorin tugenensis revealed by its femora. C. R. Palevol, 1: 191–203.
289. Wolpoff, M., Senut, B., Pickford, M., & Hawks, J., 2002. Palaeoanthropology (communication arising): Sahelanthropus or Sahelpithecus? Nature, 419: 581–582.
290. Pickford, M., 2002. New reconstruction of the Moroto hominoid palate and a reassessment of its affinities to Afropithecus turkanensis. Human Evolution, 17: 1–19.
291. Pickford, M., 2002. Early Miocene grassland ecosystem at Bukwa, Mount Elgon, Uganda. C. R. Palevol, 1: 213–219.
292. Sawada, Y., Pickford, M., Senut, B., Itaya, T., Hyodo, M., Miura, T., Kashine, C., Chujo, C., & Fujii, H., 2002. The age of Orrorin tugenensis, an early hominid from the Tugen Hills, Kenya. C. R. Palevol, 1: 293–303.
293. Gommery, D., Senut, B., Pickford, M., & Musiime, E., 2002. Les nouveaux restes du squelette d'Ugandapithecus major (Miocène inférieur de Napak, Ouganda). Ann. Paléont. 88: 167–186.
294. Pickford, M., 2002. Of Chimps and charlatans. S. Afr. Jl Sci.  98: xxxi-xxxii. (Book review).
295. Pickford, M., 2002. Ruminants from the Early Miocene of Napak, Uganda. Ann. Paléont. 88: 85–113.
296. Pickford, M., 2002. Géologie et évolution. Géochronique, 84: 40–42.
297. Pickford, M., & Senut, B., 2003. Ape lower molars with chimpanzee- and gorilla-like features from the late Middle Miocene and Late Miocene of Kenya: Implications for the chronology of the ape-human divergence and biogeography of Miocene hominoids. Abstr. Internat. Symposium "Evolution of the Tertiary Primates in Asia". Inuyama, 20–22 January 2003, Asian Palaeoprimatology, 3: 45.
298. Pickford, M., 2003. Palaeoenvironments, palaeoecology, adaptations and the origins of bipedalism in Hominidae. Abstr. Internat. Symposium "Human origins and Environmental Backgrounds", Kyoto University, 20–23 March 2003, pp. 29–30.
299. Pickford, M., 2003. The expanding Earth hypothesis: a challenge to Plate Tectonics. In: Why Expanding Earth? A book in honour of Ott Christoph Hilgenberg. G. Scalera & K.-H. Jacob (Eds) Rome, Istituto Nazionale di Geofisica e Vulcanologia, pp. 233–242.
300. Guérin, C., & Pickford, M., 2003. Ougandatherium napakense nov. gen. nov. sp. le plus ancien Rhinocerotidae Iranotheriinae d'Afrique. Ann. Paléont. 89(1): 1-35.
301. Pickford, M., & Morales, J., 2003. New Listriodontinae (Suidae, Mammalia) from Europe and a review of listriodont evolution, biostratigraphy and biogeography. Geodiversitas, 25(2): 347–404.
302. Pickford, M., & Senut, B., (Eds) 2003. Geology and Palaeobiology of the Central and Southern Namib, Vol. 2: Palaeontology of the Orange River Valley, Namibia. Mem. Geol. Surv. Namibia. 19: 1–398.
303. Pickford, M., & Senut, B., 2003. Miocene palaeobiology of the Orange River valley, Namibia. Mem. Geol. Surv. Namibia. 19: 1-22.
304. Pickford, M., 2003. A new species of Crocodile from Early and Middle Miocene deposits of the lower Orange River Valley, Namibia, and the origins of the Nile Crocodile (Crocodylus niloticus). Memoirs of the Geological Survey of Namibia, 19: 43–50.
305. Mein, P., & Pickford, M., 2003. Rodentia (other than Pedetidae) from the Orange River deposits, Namibia. Mem. Geol. Surv. Namibia, 19: 147–160.
306. Mein, P., & Pickford, M., 2003. Fossil picas (Ochotonidae, Lagomorpha, Mammalia) from the basal Middle Miocene of Arrisdrift, Namibia. Mem. Geol. Surv. Namibia, 19: 171–176.
307. Morales, J., Pickford, M., Fraile, S., Salesa, M.J., & Soria, D., 2003. Creodonta and Carnivora from Arrisdrift, early Middle Miocene of Southern Namibia. Mem. Geol. Surv. Namibia, 19: 177–194.
308. Pickford, M., 2003. Minute species of Orycteropus from the early Middle Miocene at Arrisdrift, Namibia. Mem. Geol. Surv. Namibia. 19: 195–198.
309. Pickford, M., 2003. Middle Miocene Hyracoidea from the lower Orange River Valley, Namibia. Mem. Geol. Surv. Namibia. 19: 199–206.
310. Pickford, M., 2003. New Proboscidea from the Miocene strata of the lower Orange River Valley, Namibia. Mem. Geol. Surv. Namibia 19: 207–256.
311. Pickford, M., 2003. Suidae from the Middle Miocene of Arrisdrift, Namibia. Mem. Geol. Surv. Namibia. 19: 291–303.
312. Pickford, M., 2003. Early and Middle Miocene Anthracotheriidae (Mammalia, Artiodactyla) from the Sperrgebiet, Namibia. Mem. Geol. Surv. Namibia 19: 283–290.
313. Morales, J., Soria, D., & Pickford, M., 2003. Tragulidae from Arrisdrift (basal Middle Miocene of Namibia. Mem. Geol. Surv. Namibia. 19: 359–370.
314. Morales, J., Soria, D., Nieto, M., Pelaez-Campomanes, P., & Pickford, M., 2003. New data regarding Orangemeryx hendeyi Morales et al., 2000, from the type locality, Arrisdrift, Namibia. Memoir of the Geological Survey of Namibia, 19: 305–344.
315. Morales, J., Soria, D., Pickford, M., & Nieto, M., 2003. A new genus and species of Bovidae (Artiodactyla, Mammalia) from the early Middle Miocene of Arrisdrift, Namibia, and the origins of the family Bovidae. Mem. Geol. Surv. Namibia, 19: 371–384.
316. Mein, P., & Pickford, M., 2003. Fossil Bat (Microchiroptera, Mammalia) from Arrisdrift, Namibia. Mem. Geol. Surv. Namibia, 19: 115–117.
317. Mein, P., & Pickford, M., 2003. Insectivora from Arrisdrift, a basal Middle Miocene locality in Southern Namibia. Mem. Geol. Surv. Namibia, 19: 143–146.
318. Azanza, B., Morales, J., & Pickford, M., 2003. On the nature of the multibranched cranial appendages of the climacoceratid Orangemeryx hendeyi. Mem. Geol. Surv. Namibia, 19: 345–357.
319. Pickford, M., 2003. References pertaining to the Terrestrial Miocene Palaeontology of the Namib Desert and the Sperrgebiet, Namibia. Mem. Geol. Surv. Namibia, 19: 395–398.
320. Van Damme, D., & Pickford, M., 2003. The late Cenozoic Thiaridae (Mollusca, Gastropoda) of the Albertine Rift Valley (Uganda-Congo) and their bearing on the origin and evolution of the Tanganyikan thalassoid malacofauna. Hydrobiologia, 4: 1-83.
321. Nakaya, H., Saegusa, H., Pickford, M., Kunimatsu, Y., Nagaoka, S., & Ratanasthien, B., 2003. Late Cenozoic mammalian faunas and age of hominoids from Thailand. J. Vert. Paleont. 23(3): 81A.
322. Pickford, M., 2003. Giant dassie (Hyracoidea, Mammalia) from the Middle Miocene of South Africa. S. Afr. J. Sci. 99: 366–367.
323. Pickford, M., 2003. Jon Kalb. Adventures in the Bone Trade: The Race to Discover Human Ancestors in Ethiopia's Afar Depression. Isis, 94: 556–557. (Book Review).
324. Pickford, M., Senut, B., Gommery, D., & Musiime, E., 2003. New Catarrhine fossils from Moroto II, Early Middle Miocene (ca 17.5 Ma) Uganda. C. R. Palevol, 2: 649–662.
325. Pickford, M., Nakaya, H., Kunimatsu, Y., Saegusa, H., Fukuchi, A., & Ratanasthien, B., 2003. Age and taxonomic status of the Chiang Muan (Thailand) hominoids C. R. Palevol. 3(1): 65–75.
325bis. Pickford, M., & Senut, B., 2003. Palaeontology, In: G. Schneider, The Roadside Geology of Namibia. Borntraeger, Berlin, Stuttgart, Sammlung Geologischer Führer, Band, 97, pp. 29–33.
326. Pickford, M., 2004. Belometchetskaya and Biostratigraphy. Geobios, 37(1): 119–120.
327. Pickford, M., 2004. Palaeoenvironmental reconstruction of Early Miocene hominoid-bearing deposits at Napak, Uganda, based on terrestrial molluscs. Ann. Paléont. 90: 1–12.
328. Pickford, M., Senut, B., & Mourer-Chauviré, C., 2004. Early Pliocene Tragulidae and Peafowls in the Rift Valley, Kenya: evidence for rainforest in East Africa. C. R. Palevol. 3: 179–189.
329. Pickford, M., 2004. Southern Africa: a cradle of evolution. S. Afr. J. Sci. 100: 205–214.
330. Pickford, M., 2004. Major differences in sediments of the Gregory and Albertine Rifts. 20th Colloquium of African Geology, 2–7 June 2004, BRGM, Orléans, Abstracts Volume, p. 334.
331. Pickford, M., Senut, B., Gommery, D., & Cheboi, K., 2004. Apes contemporary with early bipedal hominids: Late Miocene Lukeino Formation, Kenya. 20th Colloquium of African Geology, 2–7 June 2004, BRGM, Orléans, Abstracts Volume, p. 335.
332. Segalen, L., Renard, M., Senut, B., Pickford, M., & Lee-Thorp, J., 2004. Palaeoclimate and palaeoenvironment reconstruction of the west coast of Southern Africa during the Neogene. 20th Colloquium of African Geology, 2–7 June 2004, BRGM, Orléans, Abstracts Volume, p. 371
333. Senut, B., & Pickford, M., 2004. Le milieu forestier: berceau ancestral des Hominidés? 20th Colloquium of African Geology, 2–7 June 2004, BRGM, Orléans, Abstracts Volume, p. 374.
334. Galik, K., Senut, B., Pickford, M., Gommery, D., Treil, J., Kuperavage, A.J., & Eckhardt, R., 2004. External and internal morphology of the BAR 1002'00 Orrorin tugenensis femur. Science, 305: 1450–1453.
335. Senut, B., & Pickford, M., 2004. La dichotomie grands singes. homme revisitée. C. R. Palevol, 3: 265–276.
336. Pickford, M., Liu, J., & Pan, Y., 2004. Systematics and functional morphology of Molarochoerus yuanmouensis (Suidae, Mammalia) from the Late Miocene of Yunnan, China. C. R. Palevol. 3: 691–704.
337. Tsujikawa, H., Pickford, M., Sawada, Y., Nakano, Y., Nakatsukasa, M., & Ishida, H., 2004. Updated mammal fauna from the Lower to Middle Miocene Aka Aiteputh Formation, Northern Kenya. J. Vert. Paleont. 24 (3): 123A.
338. Mein, P., Pickford, M., & Senut, B., 2004. Late Miocene micromammals from the Harasib karst deposits, Namibia. Part 2b. Cricetomyidae, Dendromuridae and Muridae, with a complement on the Myocricetodontinae. Communs Geol. Surv. Namibia. 13: 43–61.
339. Pickford, M., 2004. Partial dentition and skeleton of Choerolophodon pygmaeus (Depéret) from Ngenyin, 13 Ma, Tugen Hills, Kenya: resolution of a century old enigma. Zona Arqueologica: Miscelànea en Homenaje a Emiliano Aguirre, Paleontologia. Madrid, Museo Arqueologico Regional, Vol. 2, pp. 429–463.
340. Pickford, M., 2004. Miocene Sanitheriidae (Suiformes, Mammalia) from Namibia and Kenya: systematic and phylogenetic implications. Ann. Paléont. 90: 223–278.
341. Pickford, M., 2004. Incisor-molar relationships in chimpanzees and other hominoids: implications for diet and phylogeny. Primates, 46: 21–32.
342. Pickford, M., 2004. Revision of the Early Miocene Hyracoidea (Mammalia) of East Africa. C. R. Palevol. 3: 675–690.
343. Segalen, L., Rognon, P., Pickford, M., Senut, B., Emmanuel, L., Renard, M., & Ward, J., 2004. Reconstitution des morphologies dunaires et du régime des paléovents dans le Proto-Namib au cours du Miocène. Bull. Soc. géol. Fr. 175: 537–546.
344. Pickford, M., & Senut, B., 2005. Hominoid teeth with chimpanzee- and gorilla-like features from the Miocene of Kenya: Implications for the chronology of the ape-human divergence and biogeography of Miocene hominoids. Anthropological Science, 113: 95–102.
345. Guerin, C., & Pickford, M., 2005. Ancylotherium cheboitense nov. sp., nouveau Chalicotheriidae (Mammalia, Perissodactyla) du Miocène supérieur des Tugen Hills (Kénya) C. R. Palevol. 4: 225–234.
346. Pickford, M., 2005. The Namib's amazing fossil spider webs. Quest, Johannesburg, South Africa. 1(4): 30–32.
347. Morales, J., Pickford, M., & Soria, D., 2005. Carnivores from the Late Miocene and Basal Pliocene of the Tugen Hills, Kenya. Revista de la Sociedad Geologica de Espana, 18: 39–61.
348. Pickford, M., & Kunimatsu, Y., 2005. Anthropoids from the Middle Miocene (ca 14.5 Ma) of Kipsaraman, Tugen Hills, Kenya. Anthropological Science. 113: 189–224.
349. Pickford, M., 2005. Orycteropus (Tubulidentata, Mammalia) from Langebaanweg and Baard's Quarry, Latest Miocene to Early Pliocene of South Africa. C.R. Palevol. 4: 1–12.
350. Pickford, M., 2005. Choerolophodon pygmaeus (Proboscidea, Mammalia) from the Middle Miocene of Southern Africa. S. Afr. J. Sci. 101: 175–177.
351. Pickford, M., & Tsujikawa, H., 2005. A partial cranium of Diamantohyus nadirus (Sanitheriidae, Mammalia) from the Aka Aiteputh Formation (16-15 Ma), Kenya. Palaeontological Research, 9(4): 319–328.
352. Pickford, M., 2005. Orientation of the foramen magnum in Late Miocene to extant African apes and hominids. Jan Jelinek Commemorative volume. Anthropologie, 43: 103–110.
353. Senut, B., & Pickford, M, 2005. Comment Orrorin a changé nos conceptions sur les origines des Hominidés. Anthropologie, 43: 111–119.
354. Pickford, M., & Senut, B., 2005. Implications of the presence of African ape-like teeth in the Miocene of Kenya. In: F. D'Errico & L. Backwell (Eds) From Tools to Symbols: From Early Hominids to Modern Humans, pp. 121–133, Johannesburg, Witwatersrand University Press.
355. Nieto, M., Hortal, J., Martinez-Maza, C., Morales, J., Ortiz-Jaureguizar, E., Pelaez-Campomanes, P., Pickford, M., Prado, J.L., Rodriguez, J., Senut, B., Soria, D., & Varela, S., 2005. Historical determinants of mammal diversity in Africa: Evolution of mammalian body mass distribution in Africa and South America during Neogene and Quaternary times. In: G.A. Huber et al., (Eds) African Biodiversity, pp. 287–295. The Netherlands, Springer.
356. Pickford, M., 2005. The Rift Valley. Africa's greatest palaeontology storehouse. Chikyu Monthly 314: 622–629.
357. Morales, J., & Pickford, M., 2005. Carnivores from the Middle Miocene Ngorora Formation (13-12 Ma), Kenya. Estudios Geol. 61: 271–284.
358. Morales J., & Pickford, M., 2005. Giant bunodont Lutrinae from the Mio-Pliocene of Kenya and Uganda. Estudios Geol. 61: 233–246.
359. Pickford, M., 2005. Fossil hyraxes (Hyracoidea, Mammalia) from the Late Miocene and Plio-Pleistocene of Africa, and the phylogeny of the Procaviidae. Palaeont. afr. 41: 141–161.
360. Pickford, M., 2005. The anterior dentition of Libycosaurus anisae and Kenyapotamus coryndoni from Beglia, Tunisia: implications for the affinities of anthracotheres and hippopotamids Notes Serv. Géol. Tunis. 73:5-49.
361. Pickford, M., 2006. Orrorin and its impact on paradigms of human evolution. African Genesis, A Symposium of Hominid Evolution in Africa, pp. 6–7, Johannesburg, University of the Witwatersrand, 8–14 January 2006.
362. Tsujikawa, H., & Pickford, M., 2006. Additional specimens of Hyracoidea (Mammalia) from the Early and Middle Miocene of Kenya. Ann. Paléont. 92: 1–12.
363. Pickford, M., 2006. Palaeoenvironments, palaeoecology, adaptations and the origins of bipedalism in Hominidae. In: H. Ishida, R. Tuttle, M. Pickford, N. Ogihara & M. Nakatsukasa (Eds). Human Origins and Environmental Backgrounds, pp. 175–198, Chicago, Springer.
364. Sawada, Y., Saneyoshi, M., Nakayama, K., Sakai, T., Itaya, T., Hyodo, M., Mukokya, Y., Pickford, M., Senut, B., Tanaka, S., Chujo, T., & Ishida, H., 2006. The ages and geological backgrounds of Miocene hominoids Nacholapithecus, Samburupithecus, and Orrorin from Kenya. In: H. Ishida, R. Tuttle, M. Pickford, N. Ogihara & M. Nakatsukasa (Eds). Human Origins and Environmental Backgrounds, pp. 175–198, USA, Springer.
365. H. Ishida, R. Tuttle, M. Pickford, N. Ogihara & M. Nakatsukasa, 2006. Human Origins and Environmental Backgrounds, 281 pp. USA, Springer.
366. Pickford, M., 2006. Bibliography of African Cainozoic Continental Macropalaeontology. Orléans, CIFEG & UNESCO (6325 refs, no pagination).
367. Pickford, M., 2006. A termite tale of climate change. Quest, 2(3): 28–31.
368. Mein, P., & Pickford, M., 2006. Late Miocene micromammals from the Lukeino Formation (6.1 to 5.8 Ma), Kenya. Bull. mens. Soc. linn. Lyon, 75: 183–223.
369. Pickford, M., 2006. Sexual and individual morphometric variation in Libycosaurus (Mammalia, Anthracotheriidae) from the Maghreb and Libya. Geobios, 39: 267–310.
370. Wolpoff, M., Hawks, J., Senut, B., Pickford, M., & Ahern, J., 2006. An Ape or the Ape: Is the Toumaï cranium TM 266 a hominid? PaleoAnthropology, 2006: 36–50.
371. Pickford, M., 2006. The enigma of hippopotamid origins. International Symposium on the Evolution of Vertebrates, 1–3 June 2006, Lund, Sweden, pp. 17–18.
372. Gommery, D., Senut, B., Pickford, M., & Kunimatsu, Y., 2006. Le post-crânien d’Hominoïde de la Formation de Lukeino ou l’apparition de la bipédie. Lucy, 30 years later: Hominids and environments in Africa from 7 to 1.5 million years ago: new discoveries and lines of research. International Conference, CEREGE, Aix-an-Provence, 12–14 June 2006, pp. 38–43.
373. Pickford, M., 2006. Hippo-thèses. Lucy, 30 years later: Hominids and environments in Africa from 7 to 1.5 million years ago: new discoveries and lines of research. International Conference, CEREGE, Aix-an-Provence, 12–14 June 2006, pp. 59–60.
374. Pickford, M., 2006. The Lukeino hominid. 30 years after. Lucy, 30 years later: Hominids and environments in Africa from 7 to 1.5 million years ago: new discoveries and lines of research. International Conference, CEREGE, Aix-an-Provence, 12–14 June 2006, pp. 61–63.
375. Senut, B., Pickford, M., Gommery, D., & Kunimatsu, Y., 2006. Le nouveau matériel dentaire d’Hominoïde des Collines Tugen. Lucy, 30 years later: Hominids and environments in Africa from 7 to 1.5 million years ago: new discoveries and lines of research. International Conference, CEREGE, Aix-an-Provence, 12–14 June 2006, pp. 67–70.
376. Ségalen, L., Renard, M., Lee-Thorp, J., de Rafélis, M., Senut, B., & Pickford, M., 2006. Neogene climatic change and emergence of C4 grasses in south western and eastern Africa as reflected in continental carbonate 13C and 18O. Lucy, 30 years later: Hominids and environments in Africa from 7 to 1.5 million years ago: new discoveries and lines of research. International Conference, CEREGE, Aix-an-Provence, 12–14 June 2006, pp. 65–66.
377. Pickford, M., Sawada, Y., Tayama, R., Matsuda, Y., Itaya, T., Hyodo, H., Senut, B., 2006. Refinement of the age of the Middle Miocene Fort Ternan Beds, Western Kenya, and its implications for Old World biochronology. C. R. Geoscience, 338: 545–555.
378. Pickford, M., 2006. Synopsis of the biochronology of African Neogene and Quaternary Suiformes. Trans. R. Soc. S. Afr. 61(2): 51–62.
379. Pickford, M. & Mein, P., 2006. Early Middle Miocene Mammals from Moroto II, Uganda. Beiträge zur Paläontologie, 30: 361–386, Wien.
380. Pickford, M., Wanas, H., & Soliman, H., 2006. Indications for a humid climate in the Western Desert of Egypt 11-10 million years ago: evidence from Galagidae (Primates, Mammalia). C. R. Palevol. 5: 935–943.
381. Morales, J., & Pickford, M., 2006. A large percrocutid carnivore from the Late Miocene (ca. 10-9 Ma) of Nakali, Kenya. Ann. Paléont. 92: 359–366.
382. Pickford, M., 2007. New mammutid proboscidean teeth from the Middle Miocene of tropical and southern Africa. Palaeontologica africana, 42: 29–35.
383. Senut B., Pickford M., Gommery D., Mein P., Cheboi K. & Coppens Y., 2006. First hominid from the Miocene (Lukeino Formation, Kenya). In Ciochon R.L. & Fleagle J.G. (Eds): The Human Evolution Source Book, Advances in Human Evolution. Pearson Prentice Hall, Upper Saddle River, New Jersey, pp. 53–58.
384. Ségalen L., Renard M., A. Lee-Thorp J., Emmanuel L., Le Callonnec L., De Rafélis M., Senut B., Pickford M., Melice J.-L., 2006. Neogene climate change and emergence of C4 grasses in the Namib, southwestern Africa, as reflected in ratite 13C and 18O. Earth and Planetary Science Letters, 244(3-4): 725–734.
385. Pickford, M., 2006. Giant hyracoid from basal Middle Miocene deposits at Gebel Zelten, Libya. Estudios Geológicos, 62(1): 495–497.
386. Pickford, M., 2006. New suoid specimens from Gebel Zelten, Libya. Estudios Geológicos, 62(1): 498–514.
387. Pickford, M., 2007. A new suiform (Artiodactyla, Mammalia) from the early Miocene of East Africa. C. R. Palevol. 6: 221–229.
388. Liu, Jian-Hui & Pickford, M., 2007. Comparison of European and Chinese Late Miocene Suidae: Implications for Biostratigraphy and Palaeoecology Vert. PalAsiat. 45(1): .59-73.
389. Nakatsukasa, M., Pickford, M., Egi, N., & Senut, B., 2007. Body weight, femoral length and stature of Orrorin tugenensis, a 6 Ma hominid from Kenya. Primates, 48: 171–178.
390. Morales, J., Pickford, M., & Soria, D., 2007. New carnivores (Creodonta and Carnivora) from the Early Miocene of Napak, Uganda. Paleontological Research, 11: 71–84.
391. Pickford, M., 2007. Suidae and Hippopotamidae from the Middle Miocene of Kipsaraman, Kenya, and other sites in East Africa. Paleontological Research, 11: 85–105.
392. Pickford, M., 2007. Revision of the Mio-Pliocene bunodont otter-like mammals of the Indian Subcontinent. Estudios Geológicos, 63 (1): 83–127.
393. Raghavan, P., Pickford, M., Patnaik, R., & Gayathri, P., 2007. First fossil small-clawed otter, Amblonyx, with a note on some specimens of Lutra, from the Upper Siwaliks, India Estudios Geológicos, 63(2): 135–146.
394. Pickford, M., & Hlusko, L., 2007. Late Miocene procaviid hyracoids (Hyracoidea: Dendrohyrax) from Lemudong'o, Kenya. Kirtlandia, 56: 106–111.
395. Gommery, D., Pickford, M., & Senut, B., 2007. A case of carnivore-inflicted damage to a fossil femur from Swartkrans, comparable to that on a hominid femur representing Orrorin tugenensis, Bar 1003’00 (Kenya). Annals of the Transvaal Museum, 44: 215–218.
395bis. Pickford, M., Senut, B., Gommery, D., Mein, P., Musiime, E., & Mungumi, A., 2007. Nouvelles découvertes d’hominoïde fossiles dans le Miocène d’Ouganda. Abstract, 20th Congrès de la Société Francophone de Primatologie, p. 67.
396. Pickford, M., 2008. Libycosaurus petrocchii Bonarelli, 1947, and Libycosaurus anisae (Black, 1972) (Anthracotheriidae, Mammalia): nomenclatural and geochronological implications. Ann. Paléont. 94: 39–55.
397. Pickford, M., 2008. The myth of the hippo-like anthracothere: The eternal problem of homology and convergence. Revista Espanola de Paleontologia. 23: 31–90.
398. Pickford, M., Wanas, H., Mein, P., & Soliman, H., 2008. Humid conditions in the Western Desert of Egypt during the Vallesian (Late Miocene). Bulletin of the Tethys Geological Society, 3: 63–79.
399. Pickford, M., 2008. Middle Miocene vertebrate fauna from Pemba Island, Tanzania. South African Journal of Science, 104: 231–237.
400. Pickford, M., Senut, B., Morales, J., & Braga, J., 2008. First hominoid from the Late Miocene of Niger. South African Journal of Science, 104: 337–339.
401. Pickford, M., Bhandari, A., Bajpai, S., Tiwari, B.N., & Mohabey, D.M., 2008. Miocene terrestrial mammals from Circum-Indian Ocean: Implications for geochronology, biogeography, eustacy and Himalayan orogenesis. Himalayan Geology, 29(3): 71–72.
402. Pickford, M., & Senut, B., 2008. Introduction to the Early Miocene Palaeontology of the northern Sperrgebeit. Memoir of the Geological Survey of Namibia, 20: 1–4.
403. Pickford, M., 2008. History of study of the fluvio-paludal deposits of the northern Sperrgebiet. Memoir of the Geological Survey of Namibia, 20: 5–9.
404. Pickford, M., 2008. Geology, stratigraphy and age of the Miocene fluvio-paludal and pedogenic deposits of the northern Sperrgebiet, Namibia. Memoir of the Geological Survey of Namibia, 20: 11–24.
405. Pickford, M., Senut, B., Morales, J., & Sanchez, I., 2008. Fossiliferous Cainozoic Carbonates of the Northern Sperrgebiet. Memoir of the Geological Survey of Namibia, 20: 25–42.
406. Pickford, M., 2008. Taphonomy of the fluvio-paludal deposits of the Sperrgebiet, Namibia. Memoir of the Geological Survey of Namibia, 20: 43–52.
407. Pickford, M., 2008. Arthropod bioconstructions from the Miocene of Namibia and their palaeoclimatic implications. Memoir of the Geological Survey of Namibia, 20: 53–64.
408. Pickford, M., 2008. Freshwater and Terrestrial Mollusca from the Early Miocene deposits of the northern Sperrgebiet, Namibia. Memoir of the Geological Survey of Namibia, 20: 65–74.
409. Pickford, M., 2008. Crocodiles from the Northern Sperrgebiet, Namibia. Memoir of the Geological Survey of Namibia, 20: 105–106.
410. Mein, P., and Pickford, M., 2008. Early Miocene Insectivores from the Northern Sperrgebiet, Namibia. Memoir of the Geological Survey of Namibia, 20: 169–184.
411. Mein, P., & Pickford, M., 2008. Early Miocene Lagomorpha from the Northern Sperrgebiet, Namibia. Memoir of the Geological Survey of Namibia, 20: 227–234.
412. Mein, P., & Pickford, M., 2008. Early Miocene Rodentia from the Northern Sperrgebiet, Namibia. Memoir of the Geological Survey of Namibia, 20: 235–290.
413. Morales, J., Pickford, M. & Salesa, M.J. 2008. Creodonta and Carnivora from the early Miocene of the Northern Sperrgebiet, Namibia. Memoir of the Geological Survey of Namibia, 20: 291–310.
414. Pickford, M., 2008. Tubulidentata from the Northern Sperrgebiet, Namibia. Memoir of the Geological Survey of Namibia, 20: 311–314.
415. Pickford, M., 2008. Hyracoidea from the Early Miocene of the northern Sperrgebiet, Namibia. Memoir of the Geological Survey of Namibia, 20: 315–326.
416. Pickford, M., 2008. Proboscidea from the Early Miocene of the northern Sperrgebiet, Namibia. Memoir of the Geological Survey of Namibia, 20: 327–330.
417. Pickford, M., 2008. Anthracotheriidae from the Early Miocene deposits of the northern Sperrgebiet, Namibia. Memoir of the Geological Survey of Namibia, 20: 343–348.
418. Pickford, M., 2008. Suidae from the Early Miocene of the northern Sperrgebiet, Namibia. Memoir of the Geological Survey of Namibia, 20: 349–364.
419. Pickford, M., 2008. Early Miocene Sanitheriidae from the northern Sperrgebiet, Namibia. Memoir of the Geological Survey of Namibia, 20: 365–386.
420. Quiralte, V., Sánchez, I.M., Morales, J., and Pickford, M., 2008. Tragulidae (Artiodactyla, Ruminantia) from the Early Miocene of the Sperrgebiet, Southern Namibia. Memoir of the Geological Survey of Namibia, 20: 387–390.
421. Morales, J., Soria, D., & Pickford, M., 2008. Pecoran ruminants from the Early Miocene of the Sperrgebiet, Namibia. Memoir of the Geological Survey of Namibia, 20: 391–464. 
422. Pickford, M., Senut, B., Morales, J., Mein, P., and Sanchez, I.M., 2008. Mammalia from the Lutetian of Namibia. Memoir of the Geological Survey of Namibia, 20: 465–514.
423. Pickford, M., 2008. Palaeoecology, palaeoenvironment and palaeoclimatology of the Sperrgebiet, Namibia. Memoir of the Geological Survey of Namibia, 20: 523–527.
424. Pickford, M., 2008. Diversification of grazing mammals in southern and equatorial Africa during the Neogene and Quaternary. Memoir of the Geological Survey of Namibia, 20: 529–538.
425. Pickford, M., 2008. Southern Africa: a cradle of evolution. Memoir of the Geological Survey of Namibia, 20: 539–554.
426. Pickford, M., & Senut, B., 2008. Geology and Palaeobiology of the Northern Sperrgebiet: general conclusions and summary. Memoir of the Geological Survey of Namibia, 20: 555–574.
427. Pickford, M., 2008. Bibliography of the Early Miocene Palaeontology of the Sperrgebiet, Namibia. Memoir of the Geological Survey of Namibia, 20: 575–577.
428. Morales, J., & Pickford, M., 2009. Creodonts and carnivores from the Middle Miocene Muruyur Formation, Kipsaraman and Cheparawa, Baringo District, Kenya. Comptes Rendus Palevol, 7: 487–497.
429. Pickford, M., Coppens, Y., Senut, B., Morales, J., & Braga, J., 2009. Late Miocene hominoid from Niger. C. R. Palevol, 8: 413–425.
430. Pickford, M., Ségalen, L., & Senut, B., 2009. Palaeofaunal potential of karst infillings of Egypt. 1st International Congress on North African Vertebrate Palaeontology. Marrakech, 25–27 May 2009, pp. 51–52.
431. Senut, B., Pickford, M., Coppens, Y., Braga, J., & Morales, J., 2009. Répartition panafricaine des Hominoidea au Miocène supérieur: apport du Niger. 1st International Congress on North African Vertebrate Palaeontology. Marrakech, 25–27 May 2009, p. 53.
432. Wanas, H., Pickford, M., Mein, P., Soliman, H., & Segalen, L., 2009. Late Miocene karst system at Sheikh Abdallah, between Bahariya and Farafra, Western Desert, Egypt: Implications for palaeoclimate and geomorphology. Geologica Acta, 7(4): 475–487.
433. Bhandari, A., Mohabey, D., Bajpai, S., Tiwari, B., & Pickford, M., 2009. Early Miocene mammals from central Kutch (Gujarat), Western India: Implications for geochronology, biogeography, eustacy and intercontinental dispersions. N. Jb. Geol. Paläont. Abh. DOI: 10.1127/0077-7749/2009/0034, pp. 1–29.
434. Pickford, M., Senut, B., & Cheboi, K., 2009. The Geology and Palaeobiology of the Tugen Hills, Kenya: Rift tectonics, basin formation, volcanics and sediments. Geo-Pal Kenya, 1: 4–133.
435. Pickford, M., 2009. Land snails from the Early Miocene Legetet Formation, Koru, Kenya. Geo-Pal Kenya, 2: 1-88.
436. Musalizi, S., Senut, B., Pickford, M., & Musiime, E., 2009. Geological and palaeontological archives relating to Early Miocene localities of Uganda, 1957–1969. Geo-Pal Uganda, 1: 2-96.
437. Pickford, M., 2009. Metric variation in Afromeryx and Libycosaurus (Anthracotheriidae: Mammalia) and its utility for biochronology. Revista Española de Paleontologia, 24: 107–120.
438. Pickford, M., Senut, B., Gommery, D., & Musiime, E., 2009. Distinctiveness of Ugandapithecus from Proconsul. Estudios Geológicos, 65(2): 183–241.
439. Senut, B., & Pickford, M., 2009. Le Rift, un laboratoire pour l’évolution géobiologique. In: B. Hirsch & B. Roussel (Eds) Le Rift est-africain: Une singularité plurielle. Marseille, IRD éditions, Publications Scientifiques du Muséum National d’Histoire Naturelle, pp. 83–93.
440. Pickford, M., 2009. Le Rift, le plus grand conservatoire paléontologique d’Afrique. In: B. Hirsch & B. Roussel (Eds) Le Rift est-africain: Une singularité plurielle. Marseille, IRD éditions, Publications Scientifiques du Muséum National d’Histoire Naturelle, pp. 95–116.
441. Pickford, M., 2009. Le kaléidoscope des paléoenvironnements. In: B. Hirsch & B. Roussel (Eds) Le Rift est-africain: Une singulatié plurielle. Marseille, IRD éditions, Publications Scientifiques du Muséum National d’Histoire Naturelle, pp. 117–133.
442. Senut, B., Pickford, M., & Ségalen, L., 2009. Neogene desertification of Africa. C. R. Geoscience, 341: 591–602.
443. Pickford, M., 2009. New Ratite Eggshells from the Miocene of Namibia. Communications of the Geological Survey of Namibia, 14: 95–139.
444. Crochet, J.-Y., Welcomme, J.-L., Ivorra, J., Ruffet, G., Boulbes, N., Capdevila, R., Claude, J., Firmat, C., Métais, G., Michaux, J., & Pickford, M., 2009. Une nouvelle faune de vertébrés continentaux, associée à des artefacts dans le Pléistocène inférieur de l’Hérault (Sud de la France), vers 1,57 Ma. C. R. Palevol. 8: 725–736.
445. Pickford, M., 2009. New Neogene hyracoid specimens from the Peri-Tethys region and East Africa. Paleontological Research, 13: 265–278.
446. Senut, B., Pickford, M., Ségalen, L., Roche, D., & Gommery, D., 2010. Paléoenvironnements néogènes et évolution des hominoïdes. In: Barbault, R., & Foucault, A., (Eds) Changements climatiques et biodiversité. Paris, Vuibert-AFAS, pp. 125–144.
447. Pickford, M., Miller, E., & El-Barkooky, A.N., 2010. Suidae and Sanitheriidae from Wadi Moghra, Early Miocene, Egypt. Acta Palaeontologica Polonica, 55(1): 1–11.
448. Sanchez, I., Quiralte, V., Morales, J., & Pickford, M., 2010. A new genus of tragulid ruminant from the early Miocene of Kenya. Acta Palaeontologica Polonica, 55: 177–187.
449. Sanchez, I., Quiralte, V., Morales, J., Azanza, B., & Pickford, M., 2010. Sexual dimorphism of the frontal appendages of the early Miocene African Pecoran Prolibytherium Arambourg, 1961 (Mammalia, Ruminantia). Journal of Vertebrate Paleontology, 30(4): 1–5.
450. Van Damme, D., & Pickford, M., 2010. The Late Cenozoic Bivalves of the Albertine Basin (Uganda-Congo). Geo-Pal Uganda, 2: 1–121.
451. Van Damme, D., Pickford, M., & Musiime, E., 2010. Brief report on Late Miocene molluscs from West Nile, Uganda. Geo-Pal Uganda, 2: 122–128.
452. Pickford, M., Musalizi, S., Senut, B., Gommery, D., & Musiime, E., 2010. Small apes from the Early Miocene of Napak, Uganda. Geo-Pal Uganda, 3: 1–111.
453. Mein, P., & Pickford, M., 2010. Vallesian rodents from Sheikh Abdallah, Western Desert, Egypt. Historical Biology, 22: 224–259.
454. Pickford, M., 2010. Additions to the Dehm collection of Siwalik hominoids, Pakistan: descriptions and interpretations, Zitteliana, A50: 111–125.
455. Pickford, M., Wanas, H., Mein, P., Ségalen, L., & Soliman, H., 2010. The extent of palaeokarst and fluvio-lacustrine features in the Western Desert, Egypt: Late Miocene subaerial and subterranean palaeohydrology of the Bahariya-Farafra area. Bulletin of the Tethys Geological Society, Cairo, 5: 35–42.
456. Morales, J., Brewer, P., & Pickford, M., 2010. Carnivores (Creodonta and Carnivora) from the Basal Middle Miocene of Gebel Zelten, Libya, with a note on a large amphicyonid from the Middle Miocene of Kenya. Bulletin of the Tethys Geological Society, Cairo, 5: 43–54.
457. Miller, R. McG., Pickford, M., & Senut, B., 2010. The geology, palaeontology and evolution of the Etosha Pan, Namibia: implications for terminal Kalahari deposition. South African Journal of Geology, 113: 307–334.
458. Pickford, M., & Tiwari, B.N., 2010. Precisions concerning the distribution and identification of Miocene hominoids from India. Revista Española de Paleontologia, 25: 107–121.
459. Pickford, M., Senut, B., Hipondoka, M., Person, A., Ségalen, L., Plet, C., Jousse, H., Mein, P., Guerin, C., Morales, J., & Mourer-Chauviré, C., 2009. Mio-Plio-Pleistocene geology and palaeobiology of Etosha Pan, Namibia. Communications of the Geological Survey of Namibia, 14: 16–68.
460. Pickford, M., 2010. Marketing Palaeoanthropology: The Rise of Yellow Science, In: Saint-Martin, J.-P., Saint-Martin, S., Oaie, G., Seghedi, A., & Grigorescu, D., (Eds) Le Patrimoine paléontologique: Des trésors du fond des temps. Bucarest, GeoEcoMar; pp. 215–269.
461. Mourer-Chauviré, C., Pickford, M., & Senut, B., 2011. The first Palaeogene galliform from Africa. Journal of Ornithology, 152: 616–622.
462. Pickford, M., & Senut, B., 2011. Biochronology of the Western Rift Valley, Uganda. DR Congo: implications for basinal history and development. East African Petroleum Conference and Exhibition, EAPCE’11, 2–4 February 2011, Kampala, Uganda, Volume of Abstracts, pp. 31–33.
463. Morales, J., & Pickford, M., 2011. A new paradoxurine carnivore from the Late Miocene Siwaliks of India and a review of the bunodont viverrids of Africa. Geobios, 44: 271–277.
464. Pickford, M., 2012. Hominoids from Neuhausen and other Bohnerz localities, Swabian Alb, Germany, evidence for a high diversity of apes in the Late Miocene of Germany. Estudios Geológicos, 68(1): 113–147.
465. Pickford, M., 2011. Lorisid from the Late Miocene of Kenya. XIX Congresso dell’Associazione Antropologica Italiana, Torino, 21-24 settembre 2011, Abstract Volume, p. 204.
466. Reichenbacher, B., Altner, M., Gehring, S., Pickford, M., Senut, B., Kiptalam, N. & Cheboi, K. (2011): Palaeoecological information of fish fossils from the Miocene palaeolakes in the East African Rift valley in Kenya. 5th International Limnogeological Congress, Abstracts volume, p. 77 (presentation). 
467. Pickford, M., 2012. Special Book Review: Cenozoic Mammals of Africa. Annals of the Ditsong National Museum of Natural History, 2: 153–158.
468. Morales, J., Senut, B., & Pickford, M., 2011. Crocuta dietrichi from Meob, Namibia: implications for the age of the Tsondab Sandstone in the coastal part of the Namib Desert. Estudios Geológicos, 67(2): 207–215.
469. Pickford, M., 2011. Small suoids from the Miocene of Europe and Asia. Estudios Geológicos, 67(2): 541–578.
470. Pickford, M., 2011. Morotochoerus from Uganda (17.5 Ma) and Kenyapotamus from Kenya (13-11 Ma): implications for hippopotamid origins. Estudios Geológicos, 67(2): 523–540.
471. Pickford, M., & Mein, P., 2011. New Pedetidae (Rodentia: Mammalia) from the Mio-Pliocene of Africa. Estudios Geológicos, 67(2): 455–469.
472. Rage, J.-C. & Pickford, M., 2011. Discovery of a Gymnophionan skull (?Caeciliidae, Amphibia) in the Early Miocene of Uganda. Geo-Pal Uganda, 4: 1–9.
473. Pickford, M., Sawada, Y., & Senut, B., 2011. Geochronology and palaeontology of the Palaeogene deposits in the Sperrgebiet, Namibia. 22nd International Senckenberg Conference, 2011, pp. 129–130.
474. Pickford, M., 2012. Orrorin and the African Ape / Hominid dichotomy. In: S.C. Reynolds & A. Gallagher (Eds) African Genesis, Perspectives on Hominin Evolution. Cambridge, Cambridge University Press, pp. 99–119.
475. Pickford, M., & Senut, B., 2010. Karst Geology and Palaeobiology of Northern Namibia. Memoir of the Geological Survey of Namibia, 21: 1-74.
476. Pickford, M., 2011. Diagenèse des spéléothèmes du Miocène supérieur (Désert libyque, Egypte): contexte géologique et observations macroscopiques. Karstologia, 57: 13–18.
477. Pickford, M., 2012. Ancestors of Broom's Pigs. Transactions of the Royal Society of South Africa, 67: 17–35.
478. Pickford, M., 2012. Lorisine primate from the Late Miocene of Kenya. Journal of Biological Research, Atti di XIX Congresso dell’ Associazione Antropologica Italiana, Torino, pp. 47–52.
479. Pickford, M., 2012. Schizoporcus vallesensis from the Dinotheriensande (Upper Miocene, Tortonian, Eppelsheim-Formation) an unexpected range extension of lophodont Palaeochoeridae (Mammalia) to the northern Upper Rhine Graben, Germany. Mainzer Naturwissenschaftlich Archiv, 49: 37–46.
480. Pickford, M., 2012. Les Suoidea (Artiodactyla) de Sansan: systématique, paléoécologie, biogéographie et biochronologie. In: Peigné, S. & Sen, S. (Eds) Mammifères de Sansan. Muséum National d’Histoire Naturelle, Paris, pp. 249–279.
481. Pickford, M., 2013. The diversity, age, biogeographic and phylogenetic relationships of Plio-Pleistocene suids from Kromdraai; South Africa. Annals of the Ditsong National Museum of Natural History 3: 1-32.
482. Pickford, M., 2013. Locomotion, diet, body weight, origin and geochronology of Metridiochoerus andrewsi from the Gondolin karst deposits, Gauteng, South Africa. Annals of the Ditsong National Museum of Natural History 3: 33–47.
483. Pickford, M., Senut, B., Musalizi, S., Gommery, D., Ségalen, L., & Musiime, E., 2013. Miocene vertebrates from the Packwach area, West Nile, Uganda. Geo-Pal Uganda, 5: 1-24.
484. Pickford, M., 2013. Suids from the Pleistocene of Naungkwe Taung, Kayin State, Myanmar. Palaeontological Research, 16 (4): 307–37. 
485. Pickford, M., & Pourabrishami, Z., 2013. Deciphering Dinotheriensande deinotheriid diversity. Palaeobiodiversity and Palaeoenvironments, 93: 121–150. DOI 10.1007/s12549-013-0115-y.
486. Pickford, M., & Tiwari, B.N., 2013. Discovery of fossiliferous karst deposits in the Himalayas, India. Himalayan Geology, 34(2): 168–171.
487. Bamford, M., Senut, B., & Pickford, M., 2013. Fossil leaves from Lukeino, a 6-million-year-old Formation in the Baringo Basin. Kenya. Geobios, doi.org/10.1016/j.geobios.2013.02.001. 55 pp.
488. Pickford, 2013. Conohyus simorrensis (Lartet, 1851) (Suidae, Mammalia) from the Middle Miocene of Carpetana, (Madrid, Spain). Spanish Journal of Palaeontology, 28(1): 91–102.
489. Pickford, M., 2013. Reappraisal of Hylochoerus euilus Hopwood, 1926 (Suidae, Mammalia) from the Albertine Rift (Pliocene) Uganda. Geo-Pal Uganda, 6: 1-26.
490. Pickford, M., 2013. Reassessment of Dinotheriensande Suoidea: Biochronological and biogeographic implications (Miocene, Eppelsheim Formation) Mainzer Naturwissenschaftliches Archiv, 50: 155–193.
491. Roche, D., Ségalen, L., Senut, B., & Pickford, M., 2013. Stable isotope analyses of tooth enamel carbonate of large herbivores from the Tugen Hills deposits: Palaeoenvironmental context of the earliest Kenyan hominids. Earth and Planetary Science Letters, 381: 39–51.
492. Rage, J.-C., Pickford, M., & Senut, B., 2013. Amphibians and Squamates from the middle Eocene of Namibia, with comments on the pre-Miocene anurans from Africa. Annales de Paléontologie, 99: 217–242.
493. Pickford, M., 2013. Re-assessment of the suids from the Sables marins de Montpellier and selection of a lectotype for Sus provincialis Blainville, 1847. Geodiversitas, 35(3): 655–689.
494. Pickford, M., 2013. A Middle Miocene large Hominoid from Thannhausen (MN 5–6) Germany. Zitteliana, A53: 31–36.
495. Pickford, M., Gheerbrant, E., Sen, S., Roger, J., & Sulaimani, Z., 2014. Palaeogene non-marine molluscs from Oman: implications for the timing of uplift of the Dhofar Plateau and the opening of the Red Sea and Gulf of Aden. In: Rollinson, H. R., Searle, M. P., Abbasi, I. A., Al-Lazki, A. & Al-Kindi, M. H. (Eds). Tectonic Evolution of the Oman Mountains. Geological Society, London, Special Publications, 392, 89–102.
496. Pickford, M., Senut, B., Musalizi, S., & Musiime, E., 2013. The osteology of Nonanomalurus soniae, a non-volant arboreal rodent (Mammalia) from the Early Miocene of Napak, Uganda. Geo-Pal Uganda, 7: 1-33.
497. Pickford, M., 2013. New specimens of Brachyhyrax aequatorialis (Geniohyidae) and Meroehyrax bateae (Pliohyracidae) from East Africa. Geo-Pal Uganda, 8: 1–8.
498. Pickford, M., Senut, B., Musalizi, S., & Musiime, E., 2014. Osteology of Afrocricetodon songhori Lavocat, 1973, from Napak, Early Miocene, Uganda: Keeping a low profile. Geo-Pal Uganda, 9: 1-22. 
499. Pickford, M., & Laurent, Y., 2014. Valorisation of palaeontological collections: nomination of a lectotype for Conohyus simorrensis (Lartet, 1851), Villefranche d’Astarac, France, and description of a new genus of tetraconodont. Estudios Geológicos 70(1): e002. doi: http://dx.doi.org/10.3989/egeol.41261.262
500 = 459 Pickford, M., Senut, B., Hipondoka, M., Person, A., Ségalen, L., Plet, C., Jousse, H., Mein, P., Guerin, C., Morales, J., and Mourer-Chauviré, C., 2014. Mio-Plio-Pleistocene geology and palaeobiology of Etosha Pan, Namibia. Communications of the Geological Survey of Namibia, 15: 16–68.
501 = 443 Pickford, M., 2014. New Ratite Eggshells from the Miocene of Namibia. Communications of the Geological Survey of Namibia, 15: 70–90.
502. Pickford, M., Sawada, Y., Hyodo, H., & Senut, B., 2014 (misdated 2013 in the text), Radio-isotopic age control for Palaeogene deposits of the Northern Sperrgebiet, Namibia. Communications of the Geological Survey of Namibia, 15: 3–15.
503 empty
504. Pickford, M., & Uhen, M., 2014. Namaia Pickford et al., 2008, preoccupied by Namaia Green, 1963: proposal of a replacement name. Communications of the Geological Survey of Namibia, 15: 91.
505. Sanchez, I., Quiralte, V., Rios, M., Morales, J., & Pickford, M., 2014. First African record of the Miocene Asian Mouse-deer Siamotragulus (Mammalia, Ruminantia, Tragulidae): implications for the phylogeny and evolutionary history of the advanced selenodont tragulids. Journal of Systematic Palaeontology. DOI: 10.1080/14772019.2014.930526
506. Pickford, M., Senut, B., Mocke, H., Mourer-Chauviré, C., Rage, J.-C., & Mein, P., 2014. Eocene Aridity in southwestern Africa: timing of onset and biological consequences. Transactions of the Royal Society of South Africa, DOI: 10.1080/0035919X.2014.933452, pp. 1–6.
507. Mourer-Chauviré, C., Pickford, M., & Senut, B., 2014. Stem group galliform and stem group psittaciform birds (Aves, Galliformes, Paraortygidae, and Psittaciformes, family incertae sedis) from the Middle Eocene of Namibia. Journal of Ornithology, DOI: 10.1007/s10336-014-1224-y, 12 pp.
508. Pickford, M., 2014. Sus valentini Filhol, 1882 from St Gaudens (MN 8–9) France: blighted from the outset but a key to understanding Middle Miocene Tetraconodontinae (Suidae, Mammalia) of Europe. Mainzer Naturwissenschaftliches Archiv, 51: 167–220.
509. Pickford, M. 2015. Late Miocene Suidae from Eurasia: The Hippopotamodon and Microstonyx problem revisited. Münchner Geowissenschaftliche Abhandlungen, A: Geologie und Paläontologie, 42: 1–126.
510. Deriquebourg, P., Person, A., Ségalen, L., Pickford, M., Senut, B., & Fagel, N., 2015. Environmental significance of Upper Miocene phosphorites at hominid sites in the Lukeino Formation (Tugen Hills, Kenya). Sedimentary Geology, 327: 43–54.
511. Pickford, M., 2015. Large Ungulates from the Basal Oligocene of Oman: 1. Embrithopoda. Spanish Journal of Palaeontology, 30(1): 139–148.
512. Pickford, M., 2015. Large Ungulates from the Basal Oligocene of Oman: 2. Proboscidea. Spanish Journal of Palaeontology, 30(2): 33–46.
513. Bhandari, A., Pickford, M., & Tiwari, B.N., 2015. Basal Late Miocene Mammal Fauna from Tapar and Pasuda, Kachchh. Münchner Geowissenschaftliche Abhandlungen, 43: 1-40.
514. Harzhauser, M., Neubauer, T., Kadolsky, D., Pickford, M., & Nordsieck, H., 2015. Terrestrial and lacustrine gastropods from the Priabonian (upper Eocene) of the Sultanate of Oman. Paläontologische Zeitschrift, DOI 10.1007/s12542-015-0277-1. 37 pp.
515. Pickford, M., 2015. Cenozoic Geology of the Northern Sperrgebiet, Namibia, accenting the Palaeogene. Communications of the Geological Survey of Namibia, 16, 10–104.
516. Pickford, M., 2015. Chrysochloridae (Mammalia) from the Lutetian (Middle Eocene) of Black Crow, Namibia. Communications of the Geological Survey of Namibia, 16, 105–113.
517. Pickford, M., 2015. Late Eocene Potamogalidae and Tenrecidae (Mammalia) from the Sperrgebiet, Namibia. Communications of the Geological Survey of Namibia, 16, 114–152.
518. Pickford, M., 2015. Late Eocene Chrysochloridae (Mammalia) from the Sperrgebiet, Namibia. Communications of the Geological Survey of Namibia, 16, 153–193.
519. Pickford, M., 2015. Late Eocene Lorisiform Primate from Eocliff, Sperrgebiet, Namibia. Communications of the Geological Survey of Namibia, 16, 194–199.
520. Pickford, M., 2015. New Titanohyracidae (Hyracoidea: Afrotheria) from the Late Eocene of Namibia. Communications of the Geological Survey of Namibia, 16, 200–214.
521. Pickford, M., 2015. Bothriogenys (Anthracotheriidae) from the Bartonian of Eoridge, Namibia. Communications of the Geological Survey of Namibia, 16, 215–222.
522. Pickford, M., 2015. Encore Hippo-thèses: Head and neck posture in Brachyodus (Mammalia, Anthracotheriidae) and its bearing on hippopotamid origins. Communications of the Geological Survey of Namibia, 16, 223–262. 
523. De Franceschi, D., Bamford, M., Pickford, M., & Senut, B., 2016. Fossil woods from the upper Miocene Mpesida Beds at Cheparain (Baringo District, Kenya): botanical affinities and palaeoenvironmental implications. Journal of African Earth Sciences, 2016, doi:10.1016/j. jafrearsci.2015.12.028.
524. Pickford, M., 2015. Large ungulates from the basal Oligocene of Oman: 3. Anthracotheriidae. Spanish Journal of Palaeontology, 30 (2): 257–264.
525. Pickford, M., 2016. Biochronology of European Miocene Tetraconodontinae (Suidae, Artiodactyla, Mammalia) flowing from recent revision of the Subfamily. Annalen des Naturhistorischen Museums in Wien, Serie A, 118: 175–244.
526. Métais, G., Lashari, R.A., Pickford, M., & Warar, M.A., 2016. New material of Listriodon guptai Pilgrim, 1926 (Mammalia, Suidae) from the basal Manchar Formation, Sindh, Pakistan : biochronological and palaeobiogeographic implications. Paleontological Research.
527. Mocke, H., Nankela, A., Pickford, M., Senut, B. & Ségalen, L., 2016. Fossil Freshwater Molluscs from Simanya in the Kalahari System, Northern Namibia. Communications of the Geological Survey of Namibia, 17: 68–86.
528. Pickford, M., Mocke, H. Senut, B. Ségalen, L. & Mein, P. 2016. Fossiliferous Plio-Pleistocene Cascade Tufas of Kaokoland, Namibia. Communications of the Geological Survey of Namibia, 17: 87–114.
529. Pickford, M., Mocke, H. Ségalen, L. & Senut, B. 2016. Update of the Pliocene fauna of the Ekuma Valley, Etosha, Namibia. Communications of the Geological Survey of Namibia, 17: 115–144.
530. Pickford, M., & Obada, T., 2016. Pliocene suids from Musaitu and Dermenji, Moldova: implications for understanding the origin of African Kolpochoerus Van Hoepen & Van Hoepen, 1932. Geodiversitas, 38 (1): 99–134.
531. Pickford, M., 2016. Geological Processes and Stratigraphy of the Diamond Placers of the Northern Sperrgebiet. Memoir of the Geological Survey of Namibia, 22: 1–6.
532. Pickford, M., 2016. Ferricrete in the Sperrgebiet, Namibia: age, palaeoclimatic and economic implications. Memoir of the Geological Survey of Namibia, 22: 172–198.
533. Pickford, M., & Senut, B., 2016. The fossiliferous sands of Hexen Kessel, Sperrgebiet, Namibia. Memoir of the Geological Survey of Namibia, 22: 199–208.
534. Thackeray, F., Viljoen, M., & Pickford, M. 2016. Hominin sites of Africa. In: Anhaeusser, C.R., Viljoen, M.J., & Viljoen, R.P., (Eds) Africa's Top Geological Sites, Cape Town, Struijk Nature, pp. 181–188.
535. Morales, J., Pickford, M., & Valenciano, A., 2016. Systematics of African Amphicyonidae, with descriptions of new material from Napak (Uganda) and Grillental (Namibia). Journal of Iberian Geology, 42 (2):131-150.
536. Pickford, M. 2016. Miocene monkey from Melchingen. Anthropologie, 54 (3):195-204.
537. Pickford, M. 2016. Anthracotheres from the Oligocene of Aubenas-les-Alpes, France. Annales de Paléontologie, 102:243-260.
538. Pickford, M. & Gommery, D., 2016. Fossil Suidae (Artiodactyla, Mammalia) from Aves Cave I and nearby sites in Bolt's Farm Palaeokarst System, South Africa. Estudios Geológicos, 72 (2), 24 pp.
539. Pickford, M., 2016. Revision of European Hyotheriinae (Suidae) and Doliochoeridae. Münchner Geowissenschaftliche Abhandlungen, Reihe A, Geologie und Paläontologie, 44:1-270.
540. Pickford, M., & Morales, J., 2016. Basal Middle Miocene Listriodontinae (Suidae, Artiodactyla) from Madrid, Spain. Spanish Journal of Palaeontology, 31 (2):369-405.
541. Pickford, M., 2016. Hippopotamodon erymanthius (Suidae, Mammalia) from Mahmutgazi, Denizli-çal Basin, Turkey. Fossil Imprint, 72:183-201.
542. Pickford, M., 2016. How closing the Sperrgebiet affected geological research: a brief history. Abstract, Paper 1939, 35th International Geological Congress, Cape Town, South Africa.
543. Senut, B., Pickford, M., Gommery, D., & Ségalen, L., 2017. Palaeoenvironments and the origin of hominid bipedalism. Historical Biology, http://dx.doi.org/10.1080/08912963.2017. 1286337. 13 pp.
544. Pickford, M., 2017. Mio-Pliocene palaeoenvironments of the Gregory and Albertine Rifts, the Ape-Human dichotomy, and the earliest phases of hominid evolution. 11th Egerton University International Conference and Innovation Week (Knowledge and Innovation for Social and Economic Development). Programme and Book of Abstracts, 29–31 March 2017, Njoro, Kenya, Egerton University, pp. xxxiv-xxxv.
545. Pickford, M., 2017. New evidence concerning relationships within Artiodactyla, Mammalia: radicular morphology of the dp/4, Historical Biology, DOI: 10.1080/08912963.2017.1320398. 18 pp.
546. Pickford, M., 2017. Late Cretaceous Lanistes (Mollusca, Gastropoda) from Al-Khodh, Oman. Al Hajar, Geological Society of Oman, 23: 15–27.
547. Pickford, M. 2017. Revision of « peccary-like » Suoidea (Artiodactyla: Mammalia) from the Neogene of the Old World. Münchner Geowissenschaftliche Abhandlungen, Reihe A, Geologie und Paläontologie, 46: 1–144.
548. Pickford, M., 2017. Mio-Pliocene palaeoenvironments of East African Rifts, Uganda-Kenya: earliest phases of hominid evolution. Eastern Africa Quaternary Association (EAQUA) 5th EAQUA Workshop, Mukono, Uganda, 4–7 July 2017, “Decades of Quaternary Research in Eastern Africa: Implication for Sustainable Future” Conference Booklet, pp. 25–26.
549. Pickford, M., 2017. Arsinoitherium (Embrithopoda) and other large mammals and plants from the Oligocene of Tunisia. Fossil Imprint, 73(1-2): 172–181, Praha. ISSN 2533-4050 (print), ISSN 2533-4069 (online).
550. Pickford, M., 2017. El jabali de Batallones. In: Baquedano, E. & Morales, J. (Eds) La Colina de los Tigres Dientes de Sable : Los Yacimientos Miocenos del Cerro de los Batallones (Torrejon de Velasco, Comunidad de Madrid),  Madrid, Museo Arquelogico regional, Cosmocaixa, Museo Nacional de Ciencias Naturales, pp. 453–465.
551. Pickford, M., Senut, B., Gommery, D., Musalizi, S. & Musiime, E., 2017. Revision of the Miocene Hominoidea from Moroto I and II, Uganda. Geo-Pal Uganda, 10: 1-32.
552. Mwanja, R., Musiime, E., Musalizi, S., Senut, B., Gommery, D., Ségalen, L. & Pickford, M., 2017. A brief history of the Early and Middle Miocene fossil sites at Bukwa, Uganda: discovery, research, protection. Geo-Pal Uganda, 11: 1–11.
553. Pickford, M., 2017. Bukwa dating. Geo-Pal Uganda, 11: 12–22.
554. Bamford, M. & Pickford, M., 2017. Bukwa Palaeovegetation. Geo-Pal Uganda, 11: 23–28.
555. Pickford, M., 2017. Bukwa Gastropoda, Geo-Pal Uganda, 11: 29–43.
556. Pickford, M., 2017. Bukwa Rodentia and Creodonta, Geo-Pal Uganda, 11: 44–48.
557. Pickford, M., 2017. Bukwa Afrotheria, Geo-Pal Uganda, 11: 49–53.
558. Pickford, M., Musiime, E., Musalizi, S., Gommery, D. & Senut, B., 2017. Bukwa II Hominoidea. Geo-Pal Uganda, 11: 54–65.
559. Pickford, M., 2017. Bukwa II Rhinocerotidae, Geo-Pal Uganda, 11: 66–70.
560. Pickford, M., 2017. Bukwa II Suiformes, Geo-Pal Uganda, 11: 71–79. 
561. Pickford, M., 2017. Bukwa II Ruminants, Geo-Pal Uganda, 11: 80–91. 
562. Pickford, M., 2017. Updated Middle Miocene Mammalian Fauna and Biochronology of Bukwa II, Uganda, Geo-Pal Uganda, 11: 92–95.
563. Al-Kindi, M., Pickford, M., Al-Sinani, Y., Al-Ismaili, I., Hartman, A., Heward, A. (2017): Large Mammals from the Rupelian of Oman. Recent Finds. Fossil Imprint, 73(3-4): 300–321, Praha. ISSN 2533-4050 (print), ISSN 2533-4069 (on-line).
564. Morales; J. & Pickford, M. 2017. New hyaenodonts (Ferae, Mammalia) from the Early Miocene of Napak (Uganda), Koru (Kenya) and Grillental (Namibia). Fossil Imprint, 73(3-4): 332–359, Praha. ISSN 2533-4050 (print), ISSN 2533-4069 (on-line).
565. Mason, M.J., Bennett, N.C., & Pickford, M. 2018. The middle and inner ears of the Palaeogene golden mole Namachloris: A comparison with extant species. Journal of Morphology, 279, 375–395.
566. Pickford, M. 2018. Special Issue on Sperrgebiet Geomorphology and Palaeontology, Communications of the Geological Survey of Namibia, 18, i-ii.
567. Dauteuil, O., Picart, C., Guillocheau, F., Pickford, M. & Senut, B. 2018. Cenozoic deformation and geomorphic evolution of the Sperrgebiet (Southern Namibia) Communications of the Geological Survey of Namibia, 18, 1–18.
568. Pickford, M. 2018. Land snails from the Ypresian/Lutetian of Black Crow, Namibia. Communications of the Geological Survey of Namibia, 18, 19–25.
569. Pickford, M. 2018. Freshwater aquatic and aquaphile vertebrates from Black Crow (Ypresian/Lutetian, Namibia) and their palaeoenvironmental significance. Communications of the Geological Survey of Namibia, 18, 26–37.
570. Mein, P. & Pickford, M. 2018. Reithroparamyine rodent from the Eocene of Namibia. Communications of the Geological Survey of Namibia, 18, 38–47.
571. Pickford, M. 2018. New Zegdoumyidae (Rodentia, Mammalia) from the Middle Eocene of Black Crow, Namibia: taxonomy, dental formula. Communications of the Geological Survey of Namibia. 18, 48–63.
572. Pickford, M. 2018. Fossil Fruit Bat from the Ypresian/Lutetian of Black Crow, Namibia. Communications of the Geological Survey of Namibia, 18, 64–71.
573. Morales, J. & Pickford, M. 2018. New Namalestes remains from the Ypresian/Lutetian of Black Crow, Namibia. Communications of the Geological Survey of Namibia, 18, 72–80.
574. Pickford, M. 2018. Additional material of Namahyrax corvus from the Ypresian/Lutetian of Black Crow, Namibia. Communications of the Geological Survey of Namibia, 18, 81–86.
575. Pickford, M. 2018. Tenrecoid mandible from Elisabethfeld (Early Miocene) Namibia. Communications of the Geological Survey of Namibia, 18, 87–92.
576. Pickford, M. & Senut, B. 2018. Afrohyrax namibensis (Hyracoidea, Mammalia) from the Early Miocene of Elisabethfeld and Fiskus, Sperrgebiet, Namibia. Communications of the Geological Survey of Namibia, 18, 93–112.
577. Morales, J. & Pickford, M. 2018. A new barbourofelid mandible (Carnivora, Mammalia) from the Early Miocene of Grillental-6, Sperrgebiet, Namibia. Communications of the Geological Survey of Namibia, 18, 113–123.
578. Morales, J., Peláez-Campomanes, P., Pérez, P., Alberdi, M.T., Azanza, B., Pickford, M., Ríos, M., Sanisidro, O.,  Alcalde, G., Cantalapiedra, J.L., Fraile, S., García-Yelo, B., Gómez-Cano, A.R., Hernández-Ballarín, V., Oliver, A., Cantero, E., Valenciano, A. & Montoya, P., 2018. Neogene Mammal Sites in Molina de Aragón (Guadalajara, Spain): Correlation to Other Karstic Sites of the Iberian Chain, and their Geoheritage Values. Geoheritage. https://doi.org/10.1007/s12371-018-0294-z, 12 pp.
579. Mourer-Chauviré, C., Pickford, M. & Senut, B., 2018. New data on stemgroup Galliformes, Charadriiformes, and Psittaciformes from the middle Eocene of Namibia. Paleontología y Evolución de las Aves. Contribuciones Cientificas del Museo Argentino de Ciencias Naturales “Bernardino Rivadavia”, 7: 99–131.
580. Senut, B, Pickford M., Gommery, D. & Ségalen L., 2018. Palaeoenvironments and the origin of hominid bipedalism. Historical Biology, 30, Issue 1-2: Special Issue: Tribute to Percy Milton Butler, pp. 284–296, http://dx.doi.org/10.1080/08912963.2017.1286337 (publié en ligne 2017).
581. Simon, B., Guillocheau, F., Robin, C., Dauteuil, O., Nalpas, T., Pickford, M., Senut, B., Lays, P., Bourges, P. & Bez, M., 2017. Deformation and sedimentary evolution of the Lake Albert Rift (Uganda, East African Rift System). Marine and Petroleum Geology, 86: 17–37. http://dx.doi.org/10.1016/j.marpetgeo.2017.05.006.
582. Pickford, M., 2011. Development of, and timing of events in, the Albertine Rift, Uganda-Congo. PESGB/HGS Africa Conference, London, September 7–8, 2011, p. 14.
583. Pickford, M. 2018. First record of Celtis (Hackberry) from the Palaeogene of Africa, Sperrgebiet, Namibia. Communications of the Geological Survey of Namibia, 19, 47–50.
584. Pickford, M. 2018. Diamantochloris mandible from the Ypresian/Lutetian of Namibia. Communications of the Geological Survey of Namibia, 19, 51–65.
585. Pickford, M. 2018. Characterising the zegdoumyid rodent Tsaukhaebmys from the Ypresian/Lutetian of Black Crow, Namibia. Communications of the Geological Survey of Namibia. 19, 66–70. 
586. Pickford, M. 2018. Tufamyidae, a new family of hystricognath rodents from the Palaeogene and Neogene of the Sperrgebiet, Namibia. Communications of the Geological Survey of Namibia, 19: 71–109. 
587. Sánchez, I. Morales, J. Cantalapiedra, J.L. Quiralte, V. & Pickford, M. 2018. Preliminary phylogenetic analysis of the Tragulidae (Mammalia, Cetartiodactyla, Ruminantia) from Arrisdrift: implications for the African Miocene tragulids. Communications of the Geological Survey of Namibia. 19, 110–122.
588. Sánchez, I. Morales, J. Cantalapiedra, J.L. Quiralte, V. & Pickford, M. 2018. Propalaeoryx Stromer 1926 (Ruminantia, Pecora, Giraffomorpha) revisited: systematics and phylogeny of an African palaeomerycoid. Communications of the Geological Survey of Namibia. 19, 123–131.
589. Pickford, M. Senut, B. & Bento da Costa, L. 2018. Precision concerning the age of the Gray Sandstone at Hexen Kessel, Sperrgebiet, Namibia. Communications of the Geological Survey of Namibia, 19, 132–140.
590. Ségalen, L. Pouech, J. Pickford, M. Gommery, D. Musalizi, S. Ssebuyungo, J. & Senut, B. 2018. Environmental reconstruction of the West Nile during the Mio-Pliocene transition based on mammalian faunas. International Palaeontological Congress (IPC5), Paris, 9–13 July 2018, Book of Abstracts, p. 620.
591. Bento da Costa, L. Senut, B Ségalen, L. & Pickford, M. 2018. Diversity of Miocene rodents and palaeoenvironmental reconstructions in Eastern and Southern Africa. International Palaeontological Congress (IPC5), Paris, 9–13 July 2018, Book of Abstracts, p. 622.
592. Godinot, M. Senut, B. & Pickford, M. 2018. A primitive adapid (Mammalia, Primates) in the Lutetian of Namibia and primate dispersals from Asia to Africa. International Palaeontological Congress (IPC5), Paris, 9–13 July 2018, Book of Abstracts, p. 705.
593. Pickford, M. & Gommery, D. 2018. Suidae (Mammalia, Artiodactyla) from Bolt's Farm Palaeokarst System (Plio-Pleistocene) South Africa. International Palaeontological Congress (IPC5), Paris, 9–13 July 2018, Book of Abstracts, p. 712.
594. Pickford, M. 2018. The Tahag Rhino, Atakor, Southern Algeria. International Palaeontological Congress (IPC5), Paris, 9–13 July 2018, Book of Abstracts, p. 1008.
595. Pickford, M. 2018. New data on Early Miocene Palaeochoerus typus and the origins of the family Suidae (Mammalia). Revue de Paléobiologie, Genève, 37 (2), 519–532.
596. Pickford, M. & Hugueney; M. 2018. Bransatochoerus (Suoidea: Mammalia) from the late Oligocene of Coderet (Bransat, Allier, France): osteology, diet and growth variables. Revue de Paléobiologie, Genève, 37: (2): 533–545.
597. Pickford, M. 2018. Piping, a geomorphological process relevant to African palaeontology and archaeology : sedimentary, taphonomic and biostratigraphic implications. Communications of the Geological Survey of Namibia, 20, 59–86.
598. Pickford, M. 2018. Onyx travertine in the northeastern Sperrgebiet, Namibia. Communications of the Geological Survey of Namibia, 20, 87–99.
599. Morales, J. & Pickford, M. 2018. A reassessment of Prionogale and Namasector (Prionogalidae, Hyaenodonta, Mammalia) with descriptions of new fossils from Napak, Uganda and Koru, Kenya. Communications of the Geological Survey of Namibia, 20, 113–138.
600. Godinot, M., Senut, B. & Pickford, M. 2018. Primitive Adapidae from Namibia sheds light on the early primate radiation in Africa. Communications of the Geological Survey of Namibia, 20, 140–162.
601. Pickford, M. & Morales, J. 2018. A new suoid with tubulidentate, hypselorhizic cheek teeth from the early Miocene of Córcoles, Spain. Spanish Journal of Palaeontology, 33 (2), 321–344.
602. Senut, B., Pickford, M. & Gommery, D. 2018. Dental anatomy of the early hominid, Orrorin tugenensis, from the Lukeino Formation, Tugen Hills, Kenya Revue de Paléobiologie, Genève, 37 (2): 577–591.
603. Pickford, M., Senut, B., Musalizi, S., Gommery, D. & Ssebuyungo, C. 2019. Early Miocene Victoriapithecid Monkey from Napak, Uganda. Geo-Pal Uganda, 12: 1–17.
604. Mason, M., Bennett, N., & Pickford, M., 2019 - A fossil chrysochlorid skull in the Ditsong National Museum of Natural History: Robert Broom's missing specimen unearthed? Palaeontologia africana, 53 : 207–218.
605. Pickford, M., 2019 - Orycteropodidae (Tubulidentata, Mammalia) from the Early Miocene of Napak, Uganda. Münchner Geowissenschaftliche Abhandlungen, 47: 1–101.
606. Pickford, M. & Tsujikawa, H. 2019 - Revision of African Kubanochoerinae (Suidae : Mammalia) with descriptions of new fossils from the Middle Miocene Aka Aiteputh Formation, Nachola, Kenya. Münchner Geowissenschaftliche Abhandlungen, 48: 1–105.
607. Bento da Costa, L., Senut, B., Gommery, D. & Pickford, M. 2019. Dental remains of Lower Micene small rodents from Napak (Uganda) : Afrocricetodontinae, Myophiomyidae, Kenyamyidae and Sciuridae. Annales de Paléontologie, doi.org/10.1016/j .annpal.2019.04.001
608. Kapur, V.V., Pickford, M., Chauhan, G. & Thakkar, M.G. 2019. A middle Miocene (~14 ma) vertebrate assemblage from Palasava, Rapar Taluka, Kutch (Kachchh) District, Gujarat State, western India. Historical Biology, DOI: 10.1080/08912963.2019.1648451.
609. Pickford, M. 2019. Tiny Tenrecomorpha (Mammalia) from the Eocene of Black Crow, Namibia. Communications of the Geological Survey of Namibia, 21, 15–25.
610. Pickford, M. 2019. Adapisoriculidae from the Southern Hemisphere. Communications of the Geological Survey of Namibia, 21, 26–31.
611. Pickford, M. 2019. Mandible of Namahyrax corvus from the Eocene Black Crow Limestone, Namibia. Communications of the Geological Survey of Namibia, 21, 32–39.
612. Pickford, M. 2019. New Chrysochloridae (Mammalia) from the middle Eocene of Black Crow, Namibia. Communications of the Geological Survey of Namibia, 21, 40–47.
613. Rosina, V.V. & Pickford, M. 2019. Preliminary overview of the fossil record of bats (Chiroptera, Mammalia) from the Miocene sites of Otavi Mountainland (Northern Namibia). Communications of the Geological Survey of Namibia, 21, 48–58.
614. Pickford, M., Gommery, D., Kgasi, L., Vilakazi, N., Senut, B. & Mocke, H. 2019. Southern African Tetraconodontinae : Recent discoveries. Communications of the Geological Survey of Namibia, 21, 59–81.
615. Pickford, M. 2019. Kaokoland Cascade Tufa Survey : Interim Report. Communications of the Geological Survey of Namibia, 21, 82–93.
616. Senut, B., Mocke, H. & Pickford, M., 2019. Stratigraphy, Palaeontology and Archaeology of Klinghardtfelder, Sperrgebiet, Namibia. Communications of the Geological Survey of Namibia, 21, 94–111.
617. Dericquebourg, P., Person, A., Ségalen, L., Pickford, M., Senut, B. & Fagel, N. 2019. Bone diagenesis and origin of calcium phosphate nodules from a hominid site in the Lukeino Formation (Tugen Hills, Kenya). Palaeogeography, Palaeoclimatology, Palaeoecology, 536, 109377, 11 pp. 
618. Picart, C., Dauteuil, O., Pickford, M. & Mvondo Owono, F. 2020. Cenozoic deformation of the South African Plateau, Namibia : Insights from planation surfaces. Geomorphology, 350, 106922, 17 pp.
619. Pickford, M., 2019. Land snails from the Early Miocene Legetet Formation, Koru, Kenya. Münchner Geowissenschaftliche Abhandlungen, Reihe A, Geologie und Paläontologie, 49, 1-70 (see 435).
620. Pickford, 2019. A Fossil History of Southern African Land Mammals, Transactions of the Royal Society of South Africa, 2 pp. DOI: 10.1080/0035919X.2019.1639565.
621. Pickford, M. 2020. Observations on Anthracotheriidae (Mammalia : Artiodactyla) from Napak, early Miocene, Uganda. Geo-Pal Uganda, 13, 1-29.
622. Pickford, M. & Gommery, D. 2020. Fossil suids from Bolt's Farm Palaeokarst System, South Africa: implications for the taxonomy of Potamochoeroides and Notochoerus and for biochronology. Estudios Geológicos 76(1): 1-27. e127. https://doi.org/10.3989/egeol.43542.536.
623. Al Kindi, M., Pickford, M., Gommery, D & Qatan, A. 2020. Stratigraphy, palaeoclimatic context and fossils of the Southern Rub Al Khali (the Empty Quarter): results of a geo-archaeological survey around the area of Maitan in the Sultanate of Oman. Historical Biology, 22 pp. DOI: 10.1080/08912963.2020.1717485.
624. Pickford, M. 2020. Anthracotheriidae (Mammalia : Artiodactyla) from Moroto, basal middle Miocene, Uganda. Geo-Pal Uganda, 14: 1-75.
625. Pickford, M. 2020. Descriptive catalogue of Chalicotheriidae (Mammalia, Perissodactyla) from the early Miocene of Napak, Uganda. Geo-Pal Uganda, 15: 1-36.
626. Schneider, S., Kollmann, H. & Pickford, M. 2020. Late Cretaceous to ?Paleocene freshwater, brackish-water and marine molluscs from Al-Khodh, Oman. Bulletin of Geosciences, 95 (2): 179–204.
627. Pickford, M. 2020 - Napak Gomphotheriidae (Proboscidea). Geo-Pal Uganda, 16: 1-21.
628. Pickford, M., Senut, B., Gommery, D., Musalizi, S. & Ssebuyungo, C. 2020. Descriptive catalogue of large ape dento-gnathic remains from the early and middle Miocene of Napak, Uganda : 2010-2020 collections. Geo-Pal Uganda, 17: 1-61.
629. Pickford, M. 2020. The fossil Suidae (Mammalia, Artiodactyla) from Ternifine (Tighenif) Algeria. Münchner Geowissenschaftliche Abhandlungen, Reihe A, Geologie und Paläontologie, 50, 1-66.
630. Pickford, M. 2020 Two new rodents (Rodentia, Mammalia) from the late middle Eocene of Eocliff, Namibia. Communications of the Geological Survey of Namibia, 22, 21–46.
631. Rosina, V. & Pickford, M. 2020. Miocene emballonurids (Chiroptera, Mammalia) from Berg Aukas I, Namibia (Africa) and their odontological features. Communications of the Geological Survey of Namibia, 22, 47–64.
632. Peláez-Campomanes, P., Mein, P. & Pickford, M. 2020. Fossil Sciuridae (Rodentia, Mammalia) from Berg Aukas (Otavi Mountains, Namibia). Communications of the Geological Survey of Namibia, 23, 65–89. 
633. Pickford, M. 2020. Dating the Naukluft Cascade and Barrage Tufas, Namibia. Communications of the Geological Survey of Namibia, 22, 90–105.
634. Pickford, M., Senut, B. & Runds, M. 2020. On the age of the artefact-bearing sediments in the valley north of Kerbehuk, Sperrgebiet, Namibia. Communications of the Geological Survey of Namibia, 22, 106–115.
635. Pickford, M., Mayda, S., Alpagut, B., Demirel, F.A., Sarbak, A., & Kaya, T.T. 2020. Hyracoidea from the Middle Miocene hominoid locality of Paşalar (NW Turkey). Turkish Journal of Earth Sciences, 29, 11 pp. doi :10.3906 :yer-2006-2.
636. Maiorani, M.P., Al Kindi, M., Charpentier, V., Vosges, J., Gommery, D., Marchand, G., Qatan, A., Borgi, F. & Pickford, M. 2020. Living and moving in Maitan : Neolithic settlements and regional exchanges in the southern Rub’ al-Khali (Sultanate of Oman). In : Bretske, K., Crassard, R. & Hilbert, Y.H. (Eds) Stone Tools of Prehistoric Arabia (Supplement to Volume 50 of the Proceedings of the Seminar for Arabian Studies), Oxford, Archaeopress, 2020, 83–99.
637. Riamon, S., Pickford, M., Senut, B. & Louchart, A. 2020. Bucerotidae from the early Miocene of Napak, Uganda, (East Afrca) : The earliest hornbill with a modern-type beak. Ibis, International Journal of Avian Science. https://doi.org/10.1111/ibi.12907.
638. Pickford, M., Kaya, T. & Mayda, S. 2020. Listriodon skull from the Late Middle Miocene of Nebisuyu, (Çanakkale – MN 8) Turkey. Fossil Imprint, 76 (2): 252–269.
639. Pickford, M., Kaya, T., Tarhan, E., Eryilmaz, D. & Mayda, S. 2020. Small early Miocene listriodont suid (Artiodactyla, Mammalia) from Sabuncubeli (Manisa, S.W. Anatolia) Turkey. Fossil Imprint, 76 (2): 325–337.
640. Pickford, M. 2021. Landslide geology and taphonomic context of Moroto II, Uganda. Geo-Pal Uganda, 18: 1-26.
641. Pickford, M., Senut, B., Gommery, D., Musalizi, S. & Ssebuyungo, C. 2021. Revision of the smaller-bodied anthropoids from Napak, early Miocene, Uganda : 2011-2020 collections. Münchner Geowissenschafliche Abhandlungen, A 51: 1–127.
642. Pickford, M. & Senut, B. 2021. Comments on Simiolus minutus, a poorly known late middle Miocene small catarrhine from Kenya. Münchner Geowissenschafliche Abhandlungen, A 51: 129–136.
643. Pickford, M., Kaya, T., Mayda, S. & Yilmaz Usta, N.D. 2021. A new look at Eurasian Neogene Pliohyracidae (Afrotheria, Hyracoidea) with descriptions of unpublished fossils from Turkey and a reassessment of the Montpellier hyracoid molar. Münchner Geowissenschafliche Abhandlungen, A 52: 1-47.
644. Pickford, M. & Senut, B. 2021. Fossiles dans les dunes : l’example du Namib. Géochronique, 157, 59–67.
645. Senut, B. & Pickford, M. 2021. Fossiles, dunes et diamants : l’Eden minéral de la Namibie. Géochronique, 157, 68–73.
646. Pickford, M. 2021. Europe's last anthracothere (Artiodactyla, Mammalia) from Ribolla (MN 12) Italy, Historical Biology, DOI: 10.1080/08912963.2021.1900169. 9 pp.
647. Senut, B. & Pickford, M. 2021. Micro-cursorial mammals from the late Eocene tufas at Eocliff, Namibia. Communications of the Geological Survey of Namibia, 23, 90–160.
648. Morales, J. & Pickford, M. 2021. Taxonomic revision of the genus Leptoplesictis (Viverridae, Mammalia) with description of new fossils from Grillental VI (Namibia) and Moratilla 2 (Spain). Communications of the Geological Survey of Namibia, 23, 161–176.
649. Pickford, M., Taşkiran, H., Özçelik, K., Kartal, G., Aydin, Y., Erbil, E., Kösem, M.B., Findik, B., Mayda, S., 2021. Procaviidae (Hyracoidea: Mammalia) from the Middle Pleistocene infillings of Karain Cave, Antalya, Turkey: biogeographic and palaeoclimatic implications. Revista de la Sociedad Geológica de España, 34 (1): 16–24.
650. Al Kindi, M. Charpentier, V., Mairoano, M.P., Musa, M., Pavan, A., Heward, A., Vosges, J., Marchand, G. & Pickford, M. 2021. Neolithic long-distance exchanges in Southern Arabia : A supposed road for the ‘Jade’ axes. Journal of Archaeological Science : Reports. 39, 103116, 12 pages.
651. Rosina, V. & Pickford, M. 2021. The new small emballonurid (Emballonuridae, Chiroptera, Mammalia) from the Miocene of Africa: its phylogenetic and palaeogeographic implications. Historical Biology, DOI: 10.1080/08912963.2021.1973451.
652. Pickford, M., Abdel Gawad, M., Hamdan, M., El-Barkooky, A. N., Al Riaydh, M. H. (2021): New suoid fossils (Mammalia, Artiodactyla) from the Miocene of Moghara, Egypt, and Gebel Zelten, Libya: biochronological implications. – Fossil Imprint, 77(1): 111–125, Praha. ISSN 2533-4050 (print), ISSN 2533-4069
653. Bamford, M., Pickford, M. (2021): Stratigraphy, chronology and palaeontology of the Tertiary rocks of the Cheringoma Plateau, Mozambique. – Fossil Imprint, 77(1): 187–213, Praha. ISSN 2533-4050 (print), ISSN 2533-4069.
654. Morales, J. & Pickford, M. 2022. The taxonomic status of “Ysengrinia” ginsburgi Morales et al. 1998 (Amphicyonidae, Carnivora) from the basal middle Miocene of Arrisdrift, Namibia. Communications of the Geological Survey of Namibia, 24, 1–16.
655. Rosina, V.V., Kruskop, S.V. & Pickford, M. 2022. Odontological characters of African molossid bats (Molossidae, Chiroptera, Mammalia) in the context of studies of the Miocene bat assemblages from Berg Aukas I, Namibia. Communications of the Geological Survey of Namibia, 24, 17–32.
656. Mocke, H., Pickford, M., Senut, B. & Gommery, D. 2022. New information about African late middle Miocene to latest Miocene (13-5.5 Ma) Hominoidea. Communications of the Geological Survey of Namibia, 24, 33–66.
657. Sen, S. & Pickford, M. 2022. Red Rock Hares (Leporidae, Lagomorpha) past and present in southern Africa, and a new species of Pronolagus from the early Pleistocene of Angola. Communications of the Geological Survey of Namibia, 24, 67–97.
658. Stoetzel, E. & Pickford, M. 2022. Étude d’un assemblage original de microvertébrés du Pléistocène moyen du nord-est de l’Algérie (Ben Kérat, Oued Zenati) et description de deux nouveaux muridés. Geodiversitas, 44 (8), 237–264.

1943 births
Living people
Alumni of Royal Holloway, University of London
Kenyan paleontologists
British paleoanthropologists